= National Register of Historic Places listings in northern Puerto Rico =

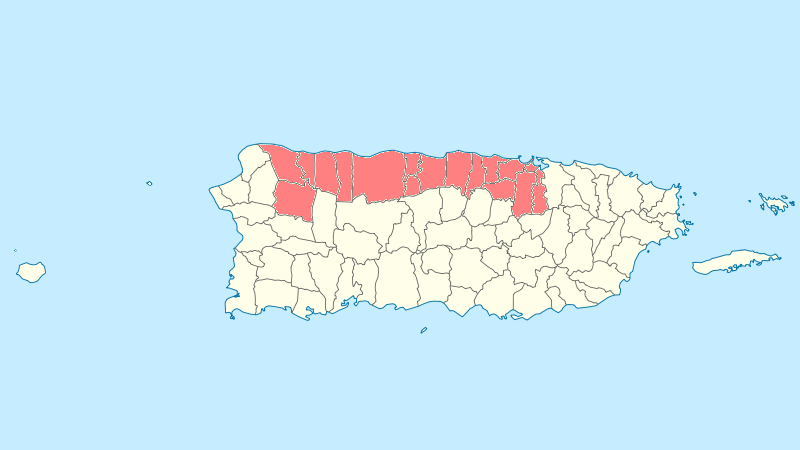
National Register entries listed below are found in the highlighted 17 municipalities of Puerto Rico.

This portion of National Register of Historic Places listings in Puerto Rico is along the north coast, north plains, and north slopes of the Cordillera, from Isabela to Guaynabo.

Names of places given are as appear in the National Register, reflecting name as given in NRHP application at the date of listing. Note, the National Register name system does not accommodate Spanish á, ñ and other letters.

This National Park Service list is complete through NPS recent listings posted May 29, 2026.

== Arecibo ==
	Name on the Register	Image	Date listed	Location	Barrio	Description
1	Calle Gonzalo Marín No. 61	Calle Gonzalo Marín No. 61	October 19, 1986 (#88000645)	61 Gonzalo Marín Street; 18°28′19″N 66°42′54″W	Arecibo Pueblo	Traditional Spanish Colonial-style residence building from before 1860. Also known as the Abreu Residence.
2	Cambalache Bridge	Cambalache Bridge	July 19, 1995 (#95000831)	Spanning Río Grande de Arecibo, west of Puerto Rico Highway 2; 18°27′13″N 66°42′09″W	Cambalache and Tanamá	Steel bridge built by the Puerto Rico Railway Company in 1893 spanning the Arecibo River as a connector between San Juan and Arecibo. Also known as the French Bridge.
3	Casa Alcaldía de Arecibo	Casa Alcaldía de Arecibo	September 29, 1986 (#86002762)	José de Diego Avenue; 18°28′21″N 66°42′56″W	Arecibo Pueblo	The city hall of Arecibo, built between 1850 and 1866 in a Classical Revival style.
4	Casa Córdova	Casa Córdova	November 17, 1986 (#86003185)	14 Gonzalo Marín Street; 18°28′21″N 66°42′49″W	Arecibo Pueblo	Historic mix-use commercial and residential building from 1898 with architecture inspired in the Neoclassical and Beaux Arts styles. Also known as Casa de las Conchas.
5	Casa de la Diosa Mita	Casa de la Diosa Mita	September 9, 1988 (#88000966)	251 Fernández Juncos Street; 18°28′17″N 66°43′09″W	Arecibo Pueblo	A now-ruined Beaux Arts house and former residence of the self-professed goddess Juanita García Peraza, founder of the Mita Congregation.
6	Casa Ulanga	Casa Ulanga	July 26, 1982 (#82003822)	7 Gonzalo Marín Street; 18°28′21″N 66°42′46″W	Arecibo Pueblo	Former Superior Court of Arecibo used throughout its history as a bank, store, city hall of Arecibo, hospital, jail and cultural center.
7	Corregimiento Plaza Theater	Corregimiento Plaza Theater	January 6, 1986 (#86000041)	Llaguerry and Toribio Pagán Streets; 18°28′22″N 66°42′55″W	Arecibo Pueblo	Classical Revival-style theater from 1876. Also known as the Oliver Theater.
8	Edificio Oliver	Edificio Oliver	October 1, 1986 (#86002764)	64 José de Diego Avenue; 18°28′21″N 66°42′55″W	Arecibo Pueblo	Beaux Arts-style building formerly used as a Casa del Rey, courthouse and school. Now used as a municipal office building.
9	Faro de Arecibo	Faro de Arecibo	November 23, 1977 (#77001546)	Punta Morillos, Highway 655; 18°28′55″N 66°41′55″W	Arecibo Pueblo	Spanish-built Neoclassical lighthouse from 1898, the last one to be built by Spain before the Spanish-American War. Part of the Lighthouse System of Puerto Rico TR.
10	Federico Degetau Consolidated Rural School	Federico Degetau Consolidated Rural School	May 26, 2020 (#100005236)	Carretera #662 Km. 68; 18°26′45″N 66°39′55″W	Santana	Historic school building for primary and secondary education in the rural Santana barrio of Arecibo.
11	Gonzalo Marín 101	Gonzalo Marín 101	November 19, 1986 (#86003183)	101 Gonzalo Marín Street; 18°28′18″N 66°42′56″W	Arecibo Pueblo	One of the oldest purpose-built bank buildings in the region, designed in a Spanish Neoclassical style. Popularly known as the Old Citibank Building.
12	National Astronomy and Ionosphere Center	National Astronomy and Ionosphere Center	September 23, 2008 (#07000525)	Highway 625, San Rafael Sector; 18°20′45″N 66°45′10″W	Esperanza	Observatory complex consisting of radio telescopes and a LIDAR facility, most notably the Arecibo Telescope, a large spherical reflector built into a sinkhole in the middle of the Northern Puerto Rico karst region, formerly the largest of its kind in the world.
13	Palacio del Marqués de las Claras	Palacio del Marqués de las Claras	July 12, 1988 (#88000964)	58 Gonzalo Marín Street; 18°28′20″N 66°42′53″W	Arecibo Pueblo	Neoclassical urban mansion built in 1888 for Fernando Fernández Umpierre, Marquis de las Claras, a wealthy owner of sugarcane plantations. Formerly served as the Casino of Arecibo and currently used as an event venue.
14	Paseo Víctor Rojas	Paseo Víctor Rojas	November 19, 1986 (#86003188)	Gonzalo Marín Street at José de Diego Avenue; 18°28′22″N 66°42′42″W	Arecibo Pueblo	Rectangular promenade designed in a Neoclásico Isabelino-style and built in 1881 at the site of a former Spanish fort. Also known as the Paseo de Damas.
15	Franklin Delano Roosevelt Graded School		February 8, 2021 (#100006152)	Calle Oriente No. 218; 18°28′18″N 66°43′09″W	Arecibo vicinity	Historic Art Deco style school built in 1938 on top of a hill in downtown Arecibo at the site of a former hermitage.

== Barceloneta ==
	Name on the Register	Image	Date listed	Location	Barrio	Description
1	Rafael Balseiro Maceira School	Rafael Balseiro Maceira School	August 28, 2012 (#12000583)	1 Georgetti Street; 18°27′09″N 66°32′20″W	Barceloneta Pueblo	Example of the Late 19th And Early 20th Century AmericanPrairie School, Eclectic architecture movements, part of the Early Twentieth Century Schools in Puerto Rico Thematic Resource (TR).

== Bayamón ==
	Name on the Register	Image	Date listed	Location	Barrio	Description
1	Casa Dr. Agustín Stahl Stamm	Casa Dr. Agustín Stahl Stamm	February 4, 2011 (#10001216)	14 José Martí St. 18°23′56″N 66°09′19″W	Bayamón Pueblo	This 1840s house was the residence and laboratory of internationally recognized scientist Agustín Stahl (1842–1917) (Note: The Stahl House's National Register of Historic Places nomination form gives a birth date of 1841 for Agustín Stahl, while most other references, such as the Smithsonian Institution, state 1842.) from 1865 until his death. Despite a modest physician's income, Stahl published important works in zoology, botany, medicine, agriculture, ethnology, demography, and history, and led public health campaigns across Puerto Rico.
2	Casa Natal Dr. José Celso Barbosa	Casa Natal Dr. José Celso Barbosa	August 24, 1984 (#84003156)	16 Barbosa St. 18°23′57″N 66°09′16″W	Bayamón Pueblo	House from 1850, associated with physician and sociologist José Celso Barbosa, known as the father of the Puerto Rico statehood movement. Now owned by the Institute of Puerto Rican Culture and operated as a historic house museum.
3	Church Santa Cruz of Bayamón	Church Santa Cruz of Bayamón	September 18, 1984 (#84003162)	Plaza de Hostos; 18°23′56″N 66°09′21″W	Bayamón Pueblo	Historic parish church from 1772, built atop a hill known as Alto del Embarcadero around which the modern city of Bayamón was developed.
4	Farmacia Serra		May 4, 1989 (#88000685)	11 Degetau St. 18°23′57″N 66°09′20″W	Bayamón Pueblo	Eclectic Rennaissance Revival residential and commercial mixed-use building from 1910 that housed the first store of the Serra drugstore chain.
5	Marqués de la Serna Bridge	Marqués de la Serna Bridge	July 19, 1995 (#95000850)	Highway 890, km 24.1; 18°24′10″N 66°09′21″W	Juan Sánchez and Bayamón Pueblo	A well-preserved rolled iron segmented arch bridge and the only one of its kind in Puerto Rico. Also known as the Bayamón Bridge or Bridge No. 379.
6	Plata Bridge	Plata Bridge	July 19, 1995 (#95000849)	Highway 167, km 0.9; 18°18′14″N 66°12′41″W	Dajaos and Nuevo (Note: The Plata Bridge spans the boundary between Bayamón (Barrio Dajaos) and Naranjito (Barrio Nuevo) municipalities.)	Bridge built to span La Plata River in 1908 consisting of two Parker truss spans, the only of its kind in Puerto Rico.
7	Puerto Rico National Cemetery	Puerto Rico National Cemetery	September 26, 1983 (#83002298)	Highway 168; 18°24′44″N 66°10′00″W	Hato Tejas	The only United States national cemetery outside of mainland U.S., established 1948 at a mogote-surrounded site surrounded formerly owned by the United States Navy.

== Camuy ==
	Name on the Register	Image	Date listed	Location	Barrio	Description
1	Antiguo Casino Camuyano	Antiguo Casino Camuyano	January 26, 1984 (#84003123)	Estrella and Muñoz Rivera Streets; 18°29′03″N 66°50′42″W	Camuy Pueblo	Classical Revival-style reinforced concrete building from 1910 that served as both a casino and as an event building
2	Ernesto Memorial Chapel	Ernesto Memorial Chapel	July 8, 2010 (#10000453)	Intersection of Highway 486 and Highway 488; 18°25′59″N 66°51′16″W	Abra Honda	American Craftsman-style Methodist chapel from 1912 designed by Albert Munson and built as a memorial for Ernesto Kiplinger. Popularly known as la Iglesia de Piedra (the Stone Church).
3	Hacienda La Sabana	Hacienda La Sabana	February 14, 1985 (#85000295)	Highway 119, km 9.9; 18°27′15″N 66°53′03″W	Camuy Arriba	Ruins of a former large sugarcane plantation and manor (hacienda) built in a valley between the Camuy and Guajataca Rivers in 1773 for Don Gregorio Rodriguez.

== Cataño ==
	Name on the Register	Image	Date listed	Location	Barrio	Description
1	Bacardí Distillery	Bacardí Distillery	August 6, 2010 (#10000524)	Highway 165, km 2.6, intersection Highway 888, Bay View Industrial Park; 18°27′31″N 66°08′29″W	Palmas	The world's largest rum distillery and historic district consisting of twenty-four Art Deco buildings and structures designed by Henry Klumb and others, including the famous Casa Bacardi.
2	Sanctuary of Blessed Martín de Porres	Sanctuary of Blessed Martín de Porres	January 11, 2017 (#100000503)	Comercio Street and Oeste Cementerio Street; 18°26′37″N 66°07′59″W	Palmas	Historic pilgrimage church designed in the Modernist-style by Henry Klumb.

== Dorado ==
	Name on the Register	Image	Date listed	Location	Barrio	Description
1	SS Antonio López Shipwreck Site and Remains	SS Antonio López Shipwreck Site and Remains	February 9, 1994 (#93001593)	Angelina Reef, off Mameyal Beach; 18°28′48″N 66°13′50″W	Mameyal	Sunken steel propeller merchant steam liner that once belonged to the Compañía Transatlántica Española, sunk during the Spanish–American War. Also a National Historic Landmark.
2	Casa del Rey	Casa del Rey	May 19, 1989 (#89000408)	292 Méndez Vigo Street; 18°27′32″N 66°15′38″W	Dorado Pueblo	Built in 1823 as the local casa del rey, also functioned as the Militia Guard Headquarters and the Municipal Jail of Dorado throughout its history before being used as a private residence. Associated with writer Manuel A. Alonso Pacheco.
3	Hacienda de Carlos Vassallo	Hacienda de Carlos Vassallo	March 22, 1989 (#88001848)	Highway 693, km 0; 18°24′37″N 66°15′45″W	Maguayo	Well-preserved chimney of a former sugar-processing mill built in 1861.
4	Jacinto Lopez Martinez Grammar School	Jacinto Lopez Martinez Grammar School	October 11, 1988 (#88001846)	Norte and San Quintín Streets; 18°27′36″N 66°15′43″W	Dorado Pueblo	Mission/Spanish Revival school from 1923, designed by Pedro Adolfo de Castro.
5	Residencia Don Andrés Hernández	Residencia Don Andrés Hernández	May 22, 1989 (#89000428)	196 Norte Street; 18°27′35″N 66°15′42″W	Dorado Pueblo	Well-preserved vernacular Spanish Creole house built in 1880. Also known as the Don Modesto Hernández Residence or the Casa Amarilla (Yellow House).
6	Residencia Doña Antonia Ramírez		October 11, 1988 (#88001847)	Highway 693, km 7; 18°25′43″N 66°15′54″W	Maguayo	Italianate building from 1921, designed by Camilo Munoz.

== Florida ==
	Name on the Register	Image	Date listed	Location	Barrio	Description
1	De Luxe Florida	De Luxe Florida	November 14, 2012 (#12000935)	Highway 642, km 11.1; 18°21′52″N 66°33′38″W	Florida Adentro	Historic factory building and a prime example of the early prototypes for manufacturing plants in Puerto Rico.

== Guaynabo ==
	Name on the Register	Image	Date listed	Location	Barrio	Description
1	Caparra	Caparra	February 28, 1984 (#84003155)	Highway 2, km 6.2; 18°24′19″N 66°06′50″W	Pueblo Viejo	Site of original 1508 Spanish settlement in Puerto Rico by Juan Ponce de León. It also represents the oldest European settlement under United States jurisdiction. Now home of the Museum of the Conquest and Colonization of Puerto Rico. Also a National Historic Landmark.
2	Iglesia Parroquial de San Pedro Martir de Guaynabo (Note: The name of the Iglesia Parroquial de San Pedro Martir de Guaynabo is presented here without the accent on "Mártir" in conformance with the usage in the church's National Register nomination form and Federal Register announcement of listing.)	Iglesia Parroquial de San Pedro Martir de Guaynabo	September 8, 1976 (#76002250)	Plaza de Recreo; 18°21′28″N 66°06′42″W	Guaynabo Pueblo	Historic parish church built between 1750 and 1775, it is the oldest building still-standing in Guaynabo.
3	Oficina de Telégrafo y Teléfono	Oficina de Telégrafo y Teléfono	July 3, 2012 (#12000396)	1729 José E. Carazo St. 18°21′32″N 66°06′38″W	Guaynabo Pueblo	Art Deco telegraph and telephone station and office building designed by José Hernández Márquez and constructed by the Communications Authority of Puerto Rico in 1948.

== Hatillo ==
	Name on the Register	Image	Date listed	Location	Barrio	Description
1	Church Nuestra Señora del Carmen of Hatillo	Church Nuestra Señora del Carmen of Hatillo	December 10, 1984 (#84000443)	Luis M. Lacomba Street; 18°29′12″N 66°49′31″W	Hatillo Pueblo	Historic church from 1879 designed by Pedro A. Beibal. Part of the Historic Churches of Puerto Rico MPS.

== Isabela ==
	Name on the Register	Image	Date listed	Location	Barrio	Description
1	Hermitage of San Antonio de Padua de la Tuna	Hermitage of San Antonio de Padua de la Tuna	December 2, 1983 (#83004193)	Ermita Street, La Tuna sector, Highway 2, km 106.1; 18°28′43″N 66°57′48″W	Coto	Ruins of a former village church dating to 1730 that was abandoned in the early 19th-century.

== Manatí ==
	Name on the Register	Image	Date listed	Location	Barrio	Description
1	Brunet–Calaf Residence	Brunet–Calaf Residence	September 1, 1988 (#88001306)	Corner of Quiñones and Patriota Pozo Streets; 18°25′39″N 66°29′34″W	Manatí Pueblo	Ruined former residence of the Brunet-Calaf family, representative of the residential architectural tendencies of the epoch. It was destroyed by a fire in 2016.
2	Church Nuestra Señora de la Candelaria y San Matías of Manatí	Church Nuestra Señora de la Candelaria y San Matías of Manatí	September 18, 1984 (#84003130)	Patriota Pozo Street, Town Plaza; 18°25′38″N 66°29′33″W	Manatí Pueblo	Historic parish church from 1729. Part of the Historic Churches of Puerto Rico MPS.
3	La Colectiva Tabacalera	La Colectiva Tabacalera	September 1, 1988 (#88001305)	18 Quiñones Street; 18°25′40″N 66°29′31″W	Manatí Pueblo	Industrial Neoclassical building from 1880 formerly used as a tobacco warehouse.
4	Hacienda Azucarera La Esperanza	Hacienda Azucarera La Esperanza	August 11, 1976 (#76002190)	Northwest of Manatí on Highway 616; 18°28′03″N 66°31′31″W	Tierras Nuevas Poniente	2,265-acre sugarcane plantation owned by José Ramon Fernández, 1st Marquis of La Esperanza consisting of several industrial buildings and an early 19th-century manor house. The slave quarters, trapiche and steam engines are still preserved. Also named a Historic Mechanical Engineering Landmark.
5	Plaza del Mercado de Manatí	Plaza del Mercado de Manatí	August 19, 1988 (#88001303)	Quiñones, Padial and Baldorioty Streets; 18°25′37″N 66°29′37″W	Manatí Pueblo	Art Deco and Mission/Spanish Revival architecture from 1925, designed by Rafael Carmoega.

== Quebradillas ==
	Name on the Register	Image	Date listed	Location	Barrio	Description
1	Puente Blanco	Puente Blanco	February 23, 1984 (#84003126)	Spanning Quebrada Mala Canyon on Panoramica Street; 18°29′10″N 66°55′34″W	Terranova	Bridge designed by Etienne Totti and built in 1922 across the Quebrada Mala Canyon.
2	Teatro Liberty	Teatro Liberty	May 4, 1989 (#88000963)	157 Rafols Street; 18°28′24″N 66°56′21″W	Quebradillas Pueblo	Historic theater and performing arts venue from 1921 designed by Arcilio Rosa.

== San Sebastián ==
	Name on the Register	Image	Date listed	Location	Barrio	Description
1	Church San Sebastián Mártir of San Sebastián	Church San Sebastián Mártir of San Sebastián	September 18, 1984 (#84003132)	Severo Arana Street, Town Plaza; 18°20′12″N 66°59′26″W	San Sebastián Pueblo	Late 19th century church building and one of the five historic churches designed by Puerto Rico state architect Pedro Cobreros.

== Toa Alta ==
	Name on the Register	Image	Date listed	Location	Barrio	Description
1	Church Nuestra Señora de la Concepción y San Fernando of Toa Alta	Church Nuestra Señora de la Concepción y San Fernando of Toa Alta	September 18, 1984 (#84003158)	Ponce de León Street, Town Plaza; 18°23′18″N 66°14′50″W	Toa Alta Pueblo	Historic parish church from 1752. Part of the Historic Churches of Puerto Rico TR.

== Toa Baja ==
	Name on the Register	Image	Date listed	Location	Barrio	Description
1	Ermita Nuestra Señora de la Candelaria del Plantaje		June 30, 2015 (#15000398)	Highway 866; 18°26′48″N 66°09′49″W	Sabana Seca	A now ruined hermitage built at the former plantation of Hacienda del Plantaje.
2	Iglesia Parroquial de San Pedro Apostol de Toa Baja (Note: The name of the Iglesia Parroquial de San Pedro Apostol de Toa Baja is presented here without the accent on "Apóstol" in conformance with the usage in the church's National Register nomination form and Federal Register announcement of listing.)	Iglesia Parroquial de San Pedro Apostol de Toa Baja	April 17, 1975 (#75002135)	47 Las Flores Street; 18°26′33″N 66°15′18″W	Toa Baja Pueblo	Historic parish church known for its unusual layout, facing La Plata River rather than the town square. Visited by Fray Íñigo Abbad y Lasierra in 1775.
3	San Juan National Historic Site	San Juan National Historic Site	October 15, 1966 (#66000930)	Isla de Cabras (Note: The National Register listing for the San Juan National Historic Site includes components in both San Juan and Toa Baja municipalities.); 18°27′59″N 66°08′11″W	Palo Seco	The Fortín San Juan de la Cruz unit, a Spanish fort from 1630 built at Isla de Cabras across from El Morro at the entrance to the San Juan Bay.
4	Santa Elena Hacienda	Santa Elena Hacienda	September 24, 1992 (#83004662)	North of the junction of Highway 2 and Highway 165; 18°25′50″N 66°15′28″W	Media Luna	A now ruined 500-acre sugarcane plantation and industrial complex from 1790 located in the Toa Valley, one of the earliest Spanish-developed agricultural regions in Puerto Rico and important in the historical establishment of rum and molasses production in the island.

== Vega Alta ==
	Name on the Register	Image	Date listed	Location	Barrio	Description
1	Church Inmaculada Conception of Vega Alta	Church Inmaculada Conception of Vega Alta	September 18, 1984 (#84003128)	Town Plaza; 18°24′43″N 66°19′45″W	Vega Alta Pueblo	Historic church dating from 1831. Part of the Historic Churches of Puerto Rico TR.

== Vega Baja ==
	Name on the Register	Image	Date listed	Location	Barrio	Description
1	Casa Alonso	Casa Alonso	December 13, 1996 (#96001491)	34 Betances Avenue; 18°26′39″N 66°23′11″W	Vega Baja Pueblo	Spanish Colonial residence and historic house museum associated with families related to the local sugarcane industry. Now part of the municipally owned Museum of Art, History and Culture.
2	Church Santa María del Rosario of Vega Baja	Church Santa María del Rosario of Vega Baja	September 18, 1984 (#84003133)	Town Plaza; 18°26′40″N 66°23′12″W	Vega Baja Pueblo	Historic parish church from 1860. Part of the Historic Churches of Puerto Rico TR.
3	Panteón Otero-Martínez		July 30, 1984 (#84003135)	Old Vega Baja Cemetery, Highway 670; 18°26′41″N 66°23′35″W	Algarrobo	A Classical Revival mausoleum from 1886 located in the Old Vega Baja Cemetery.
4	Paso del Indio Site		July 25, 2007 (#07000583)	Address restricted	Address restricted	One of the largest and deepest stratified multi-component prehistoric occupation archeological sites in Puerto Rico and the Caribbean.

== See also ==
- National Register of Historic Places listings in Puerto Rico
- National Register of Historic Places listings in southern Puerto Rico
- National Register of Historic Places listings in western Puerto Rico
- National Register of Historic Places listings in eastern Puerto Rico
- National Register of Historic Places listings in central Puerto Rico
- National Register of Historic Places listings in metropolitan San Juan, Puerto Rico
- List of United States National Historic Landmarks in United States commonwealths and territories, associated states, and foreign states
- Historic preservation
- History of Puerto Rico
