= Liberty Theater (disambiguation) =

The Liberty Theatre is a former Broadway theatre in New York City.

Liberty Theater or Liberty Theatre can also refer to:

In the United States

- Liberty Theater (Astoria, Oregon)
- Liberty Theatre (Camas, Washington)
- Liberty Theater (Columbus, Georgia), listed on the National Register of Historic Places
- Liberty Theatre (Eunice, Louisiana), listed on the National Register of Historic Places
- Liberty Theater (La Grande, Oregon)
- Liberty Theater (Murphysboro, Illinois)
- Liberty Theatre (New Orleans), a now-demolished theatre, located on St. Charles Avenue, part of a site now occupied by the Pan American Life Center
- Liberty Theatre (San Jose, California), originally located on Market Street, demolished in late 1982
- Liberty Theater (Walla Walla, Washington), listed on the National Register of Historic Places
- Liberty Theatre (Youngstown, Ohio)
- Teatro Liberty, Quebradillas, Puerto Rico, listed on the National Register of Historic Places

In Canada

- Liberty Theatre, in Toronto, also known as the Standard Theatre (Toronto), is said to have been the only purpose-built Yiddish theatre

In India

- Liberty Cinema, an Art Deco theatre in Mumbai, India
