= Paseo Víctor Rojas =

Historic place in Arecibo, Puerto Rico

- U.S. National Register of Historic Places
- Puerto Rico Historic Sites and Zones
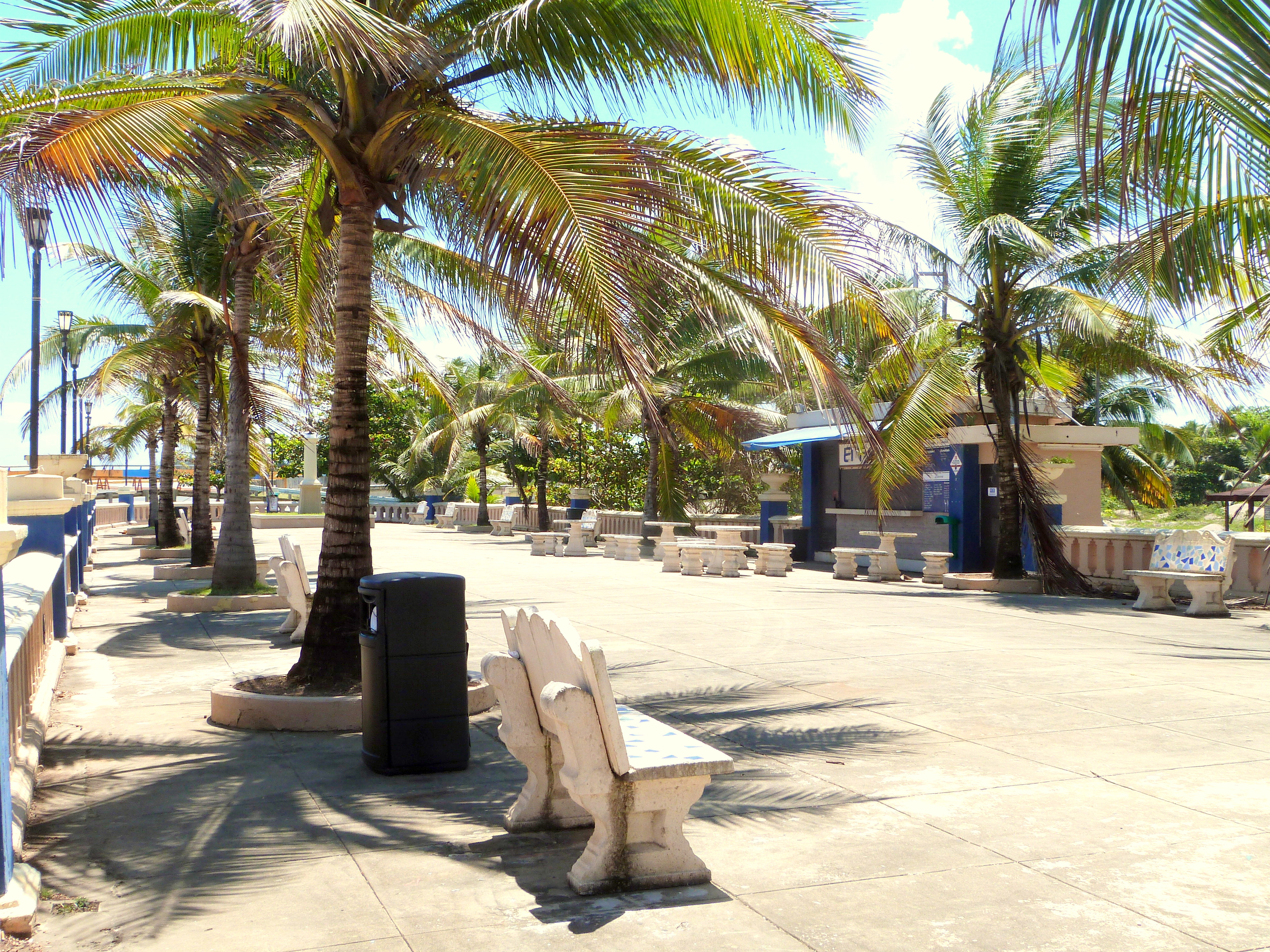
- The paseo in 2017

- Location within Puerto Rico
- Location: Calle Gonzalo Marín at Avenida De Diego, Arecibo, Puerto Rico
- Coordinates: 18°28′22″N 66°42′42″W
- Built: 1881
- NRHP reference No.: 86003188
- RNSZH No.: 2000-(RN)-20-JP-SH

Significant dates
- Added to NRHP: November 19, 1986
- Designated RNSZH: December 21, 2000

Paseo Víctor Rojas, also known as El Fuerte or Paseo de Damas (Ladies' Promenade), in Arecibo, Puerto Rico, was built in 1881. It was listed on the National Register of Historic Places in 1986, and on the Puerto Rico Register of Historic Sites and Zones in 2000.

It is a rectangular promenade that was built over the ruins of San Miguel Fort, in part using stone from the ruins.

The original paseo was damaged in the Hurricane of San Ciriaco in 1899.

It is unique as a place constructed for the "Isabellan", i.e. equivalent to "Victorian" pastime of promenading. It acquired the name "Victor Rojas" for the location of a memorial to this person, a fisherman, who undertook rescues starting from near this location, to save persons from boats foundering.

== See also ==
- National Register of Historic Places listings in Arecibo, Puerto Rico
