= Ermita Nuestra Señora de la Candelaria del Plantaje =

Historic church in Toa Baja, Puerto Rico

- U.S. National Register of Historic Places
- Location within Puerto Rico
- Location: Highway 866; Barrio Sabana Seca; Toa Baja municipality Puerto Rico
- Coordinates: 18°26′48″N 66°09′49″W
- Area: Less than 1 acre (0.40 ha)
- Built: c. 1718
- NRHP reference No.: 15000398
- Added to NRHP: June 30, 2015

The Ermita Nuestra Señora de la Candelaria del Plantaje (English: Chapel of Our Lady of Candlemas of the Broadleaf Plantain (Note: The patron saint of the chapel is Our Lady of Candlemas; the words "Broadleaf Plantain" refer not to the patron saint but to the name of the plantation (Hacienda del Plantaje) where the church was located. Also note that broadleaf plantain (plantaje) is a different plant species from the plantain fruit (plátano), which may be more familiar to English speakers.)) is a former church (now ruins) in the municipality of Toa Baja, Puerto Rico.

The ruins were listed on the U.S. National Register of Historic Places in 2015.

== See also ==
- National Register of Historic Places listings in northern Puerto Rico
