= Iglesia de la Inmaculada Concepción de Vega Alta =

Historic church in Vega Alta, Puerto Rico

- Church Inmaculada Conception of Vega Alta
- U.S. National Register of Historic Places
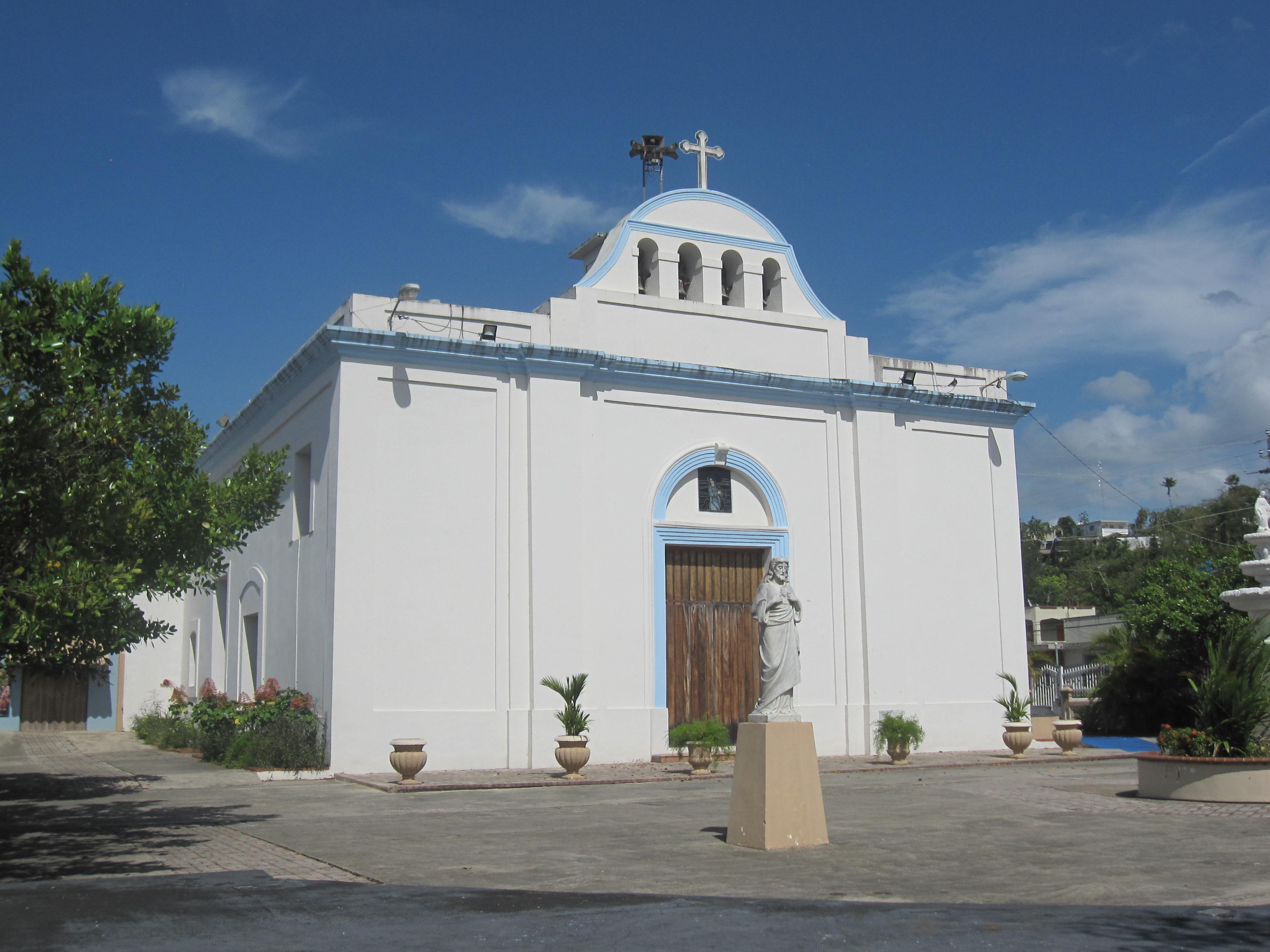
- The church in 2019

- Location within Puerto Rico
- Location: Town Plaza; Vega Alta, Puerto Rico
- Coordinates: 18°24′43″N 66°19′45″W
- Area: less than one acre
- Built: 1831
- Architect: Jose Hernandez Costa
- MPS: Historic Churches of Puerto Rico TR
- NRHP reference No.: 84003128
- Added to NRHP: September 18, 1984

The Iglesia de la Inmaculada Concepción de Vega Alta (English: Church of the Immaculate Conception of Vega Alta) is a church built by 1831 on the town plaza of Vega Alta, Puerto Rico.

It was listed on the U.S. National Register of Historic Places in 1984 as the "Church Inmaculada Conception of Vega Alta".

== Gallery ==
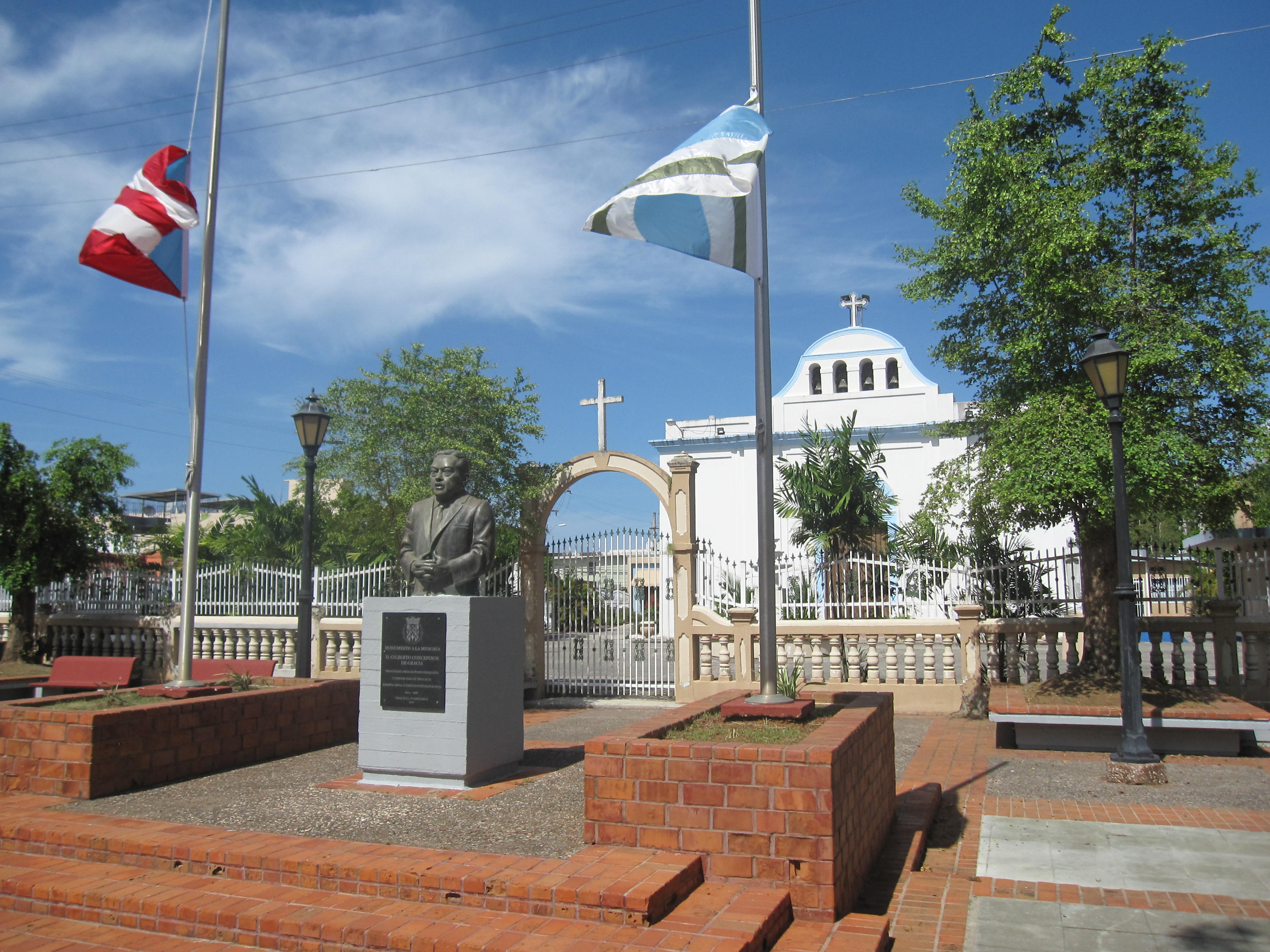
The church with flags at half-mast

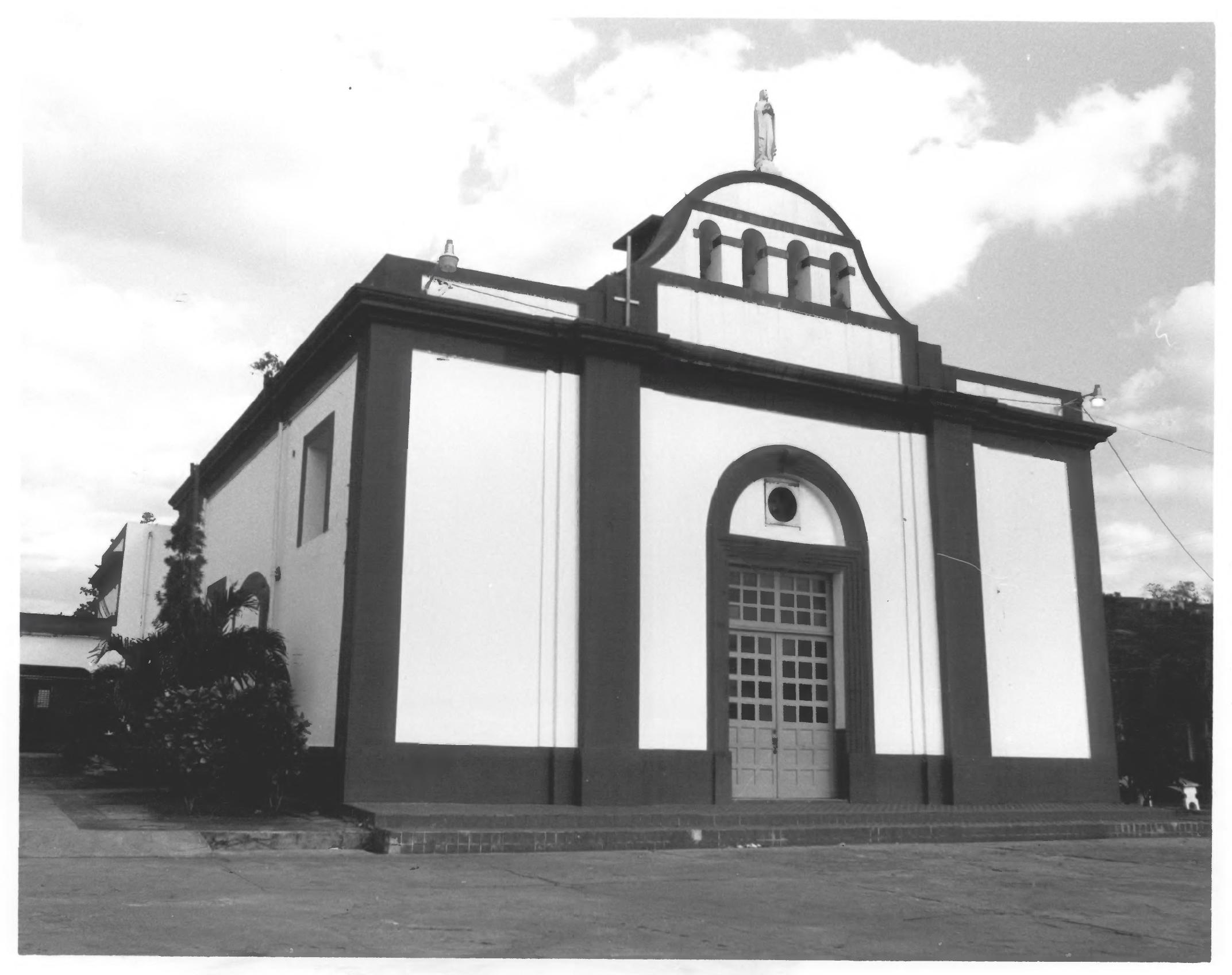
The church in 1984

== See also ==
- National Register of Historic Places listings in northern Puerto Rico
