= Antiguo Casino Camuyano =

Historic building in Camuy, Puerto Rico

- U.S. National Register of Historic Places
- Puerto Rico Historic Sites and Zones
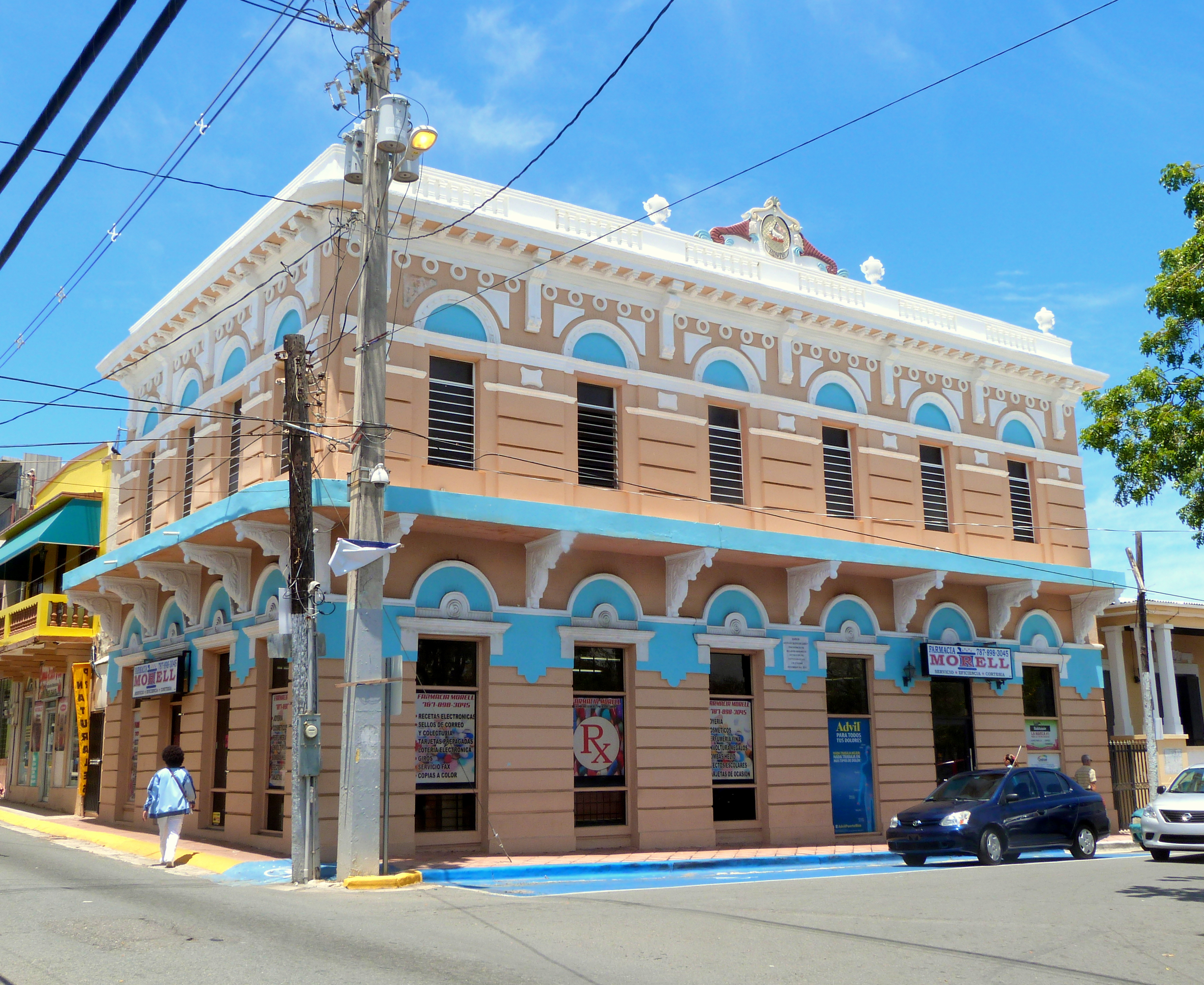
- The Antiguo Casino Camuyano in 2017

- Location within Puerto Rico
- Location: Estella and Munoz Rivera Sts., Camuy, Puerto Rico
- Coordinates: 18°29′10″N 66°50′44″W
- Built: 1910
- Architectural style: Classical Revival
- NRHP reference No.: 84003123
- RNSZH No.: 2000-(RMSJ)-00-JP-SH

Significant dates
- Added to NRHP: January 26, 1984
- Designated RNSZH: December 21, 2000

Antiguo Casino Camuyano is a building in downtown Camuy, Puerto Rico, which dates from 1910. It was listed on the U.S. National Register of Historic Places in 1984 and on the Puerto Rico Register of Historic Sites and Zones in 2000.

The building was the center of political and social life in Camuy. It was the first reinforced concrete building in Camuy and its relatively fireproof construction was tested in 1910 and 1927 with fires that consumed much of downtown Camuy.

== See also ==
- National Register of Historic Places listings in Camuy, Puerto Rico
