= Gonzalo Marín 101 =

Historic building in Arecibo, Puerto Rico

- U.S. National Register of Historic Places
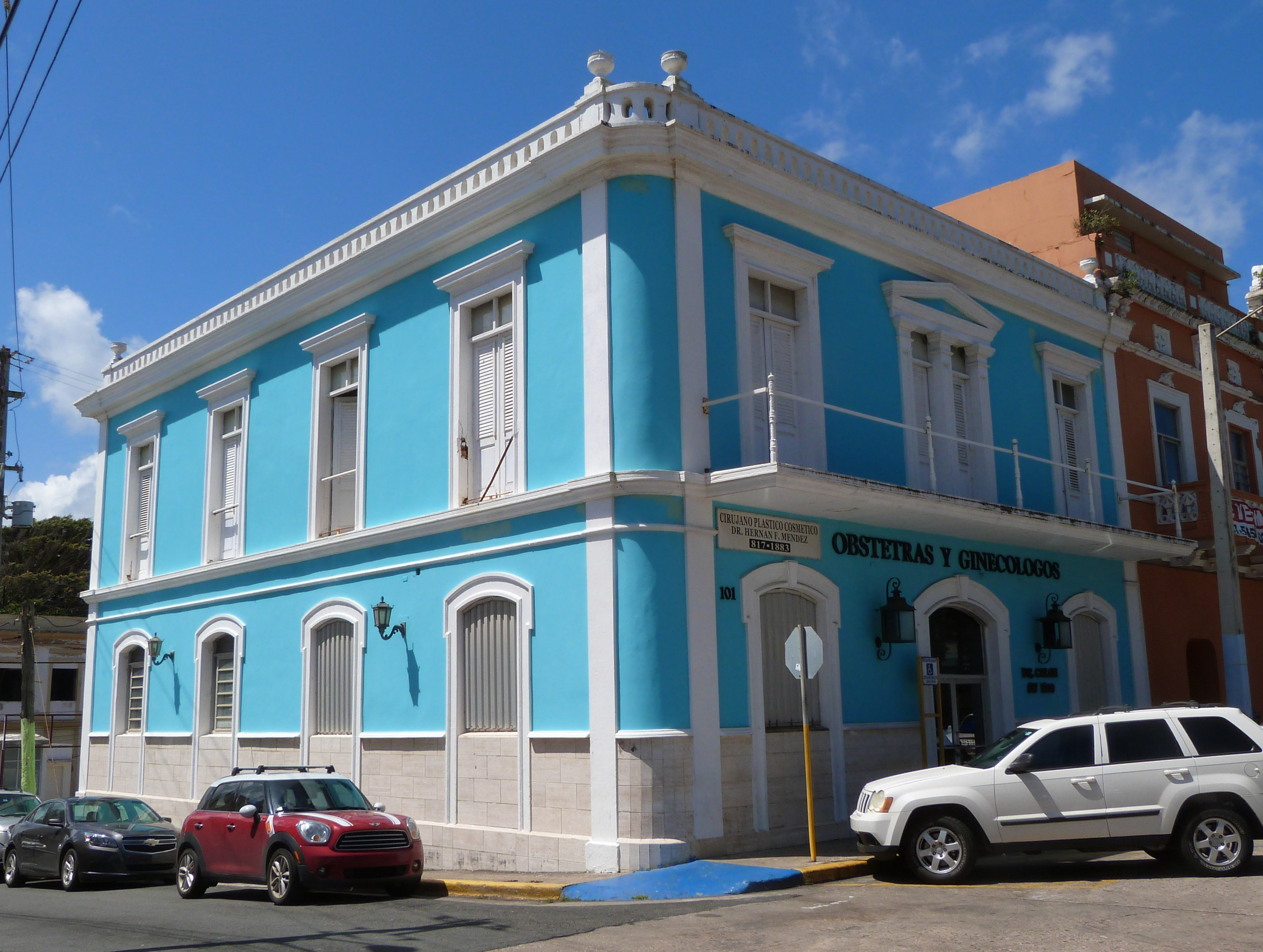
- Gonzalo Marín 101 in 2017

- Location within Puerto Rico
- Location: 101 Gonzalo Marin St., Arecibo, Puerto Rico
- Coordinates: 18°28′22″N 66°42′56″W
- Area: less than one acre
- Built: 1908
- Architectural style: Classical Revival, Late neoclassical
- NRHP reference No.: 86003183
- Added to NRHP: November 19, 1986

Gonzalo Marín 101 (also known as the Old Citibank Building) located in Arecibo, Puerto Rico is a private building used for commercial purposes that was listed in the US National Register of Historic Places on November 19, 1986.

The structure located at 101 Gonzalo Marín Street, on the southeast corner of Hostos de Arecibo Street in Arecibo barrio-pueblo, was built in 1908 to house banking institutions. For most of its history, the structure was occupied by the most important banking institutions in Arecibo.

In the 1930s, First National City Bank, the first American bank in the northwest region of Puerto Rico opened its branch in this building. The bank quickly gained importance as it became the financial center of the North American sugar estates in the Arecibo region. Banks in Puerto Rico helped keep sugar as the main line of the economy through direct financing of the sugarcane industry until 1950.

This building represents the transition between the Spanish Neoclassical period and the new Baroque architectural movement that was already widespread in the United States for the first decade of the 20th century. The use of the pediment and the decorative moldings around the doors contrast sharply with the austerity representative of the Spanish Neoclassical period. This structure is the only example of the transition period between one style and another in Puerto Rico.

== Gallery ==
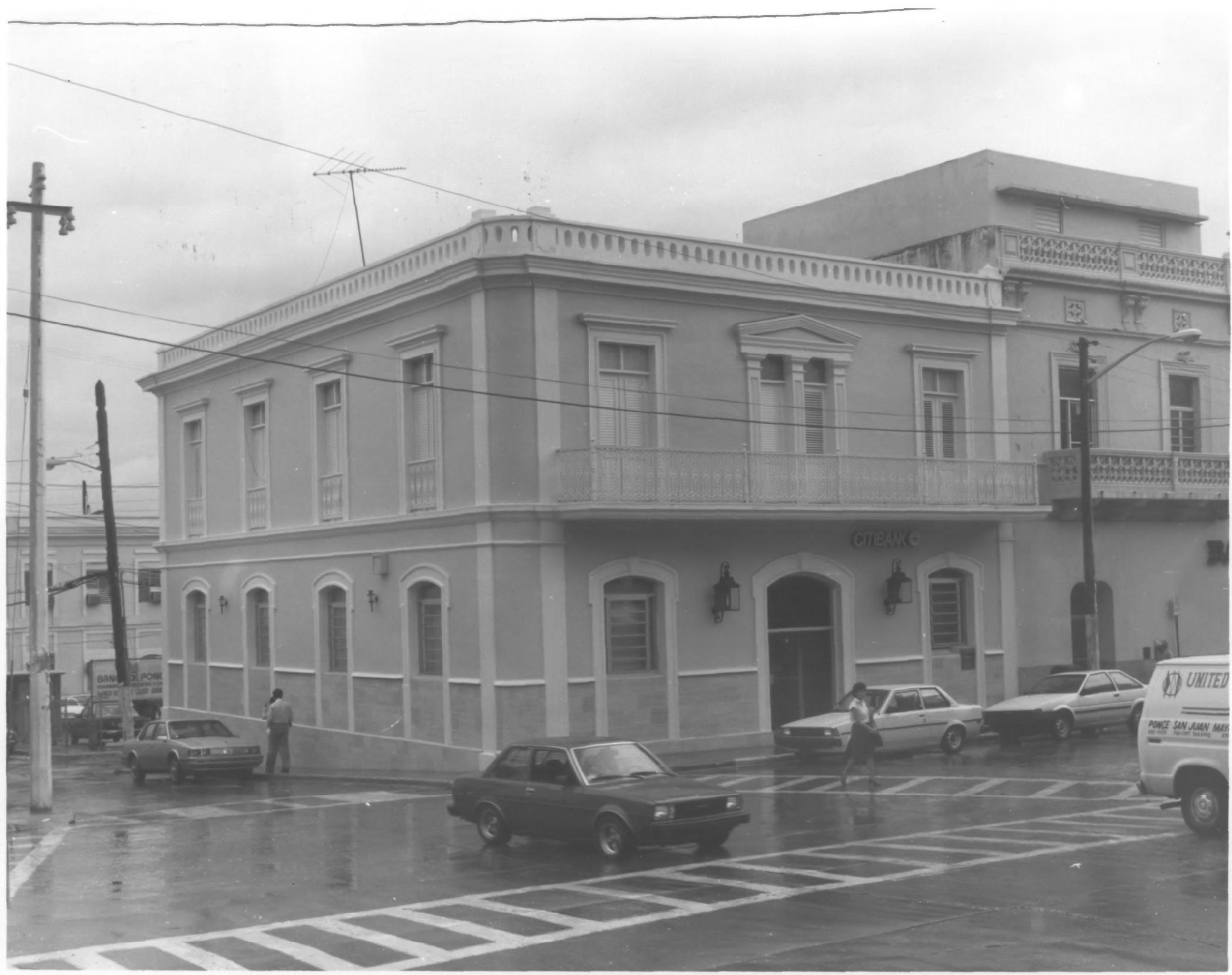
Gonzalo Marín 101 building in 1985

== See also ==
- Palacio del Marqués de las Claras
