= Gonzalo Marín 61 =

Building in Arecibo, Puerto Rico

- Calle Gonzalo Marín No. 61
- U.S. National Register of Historic Places
- Puerto Rico Historic Sites and Zones
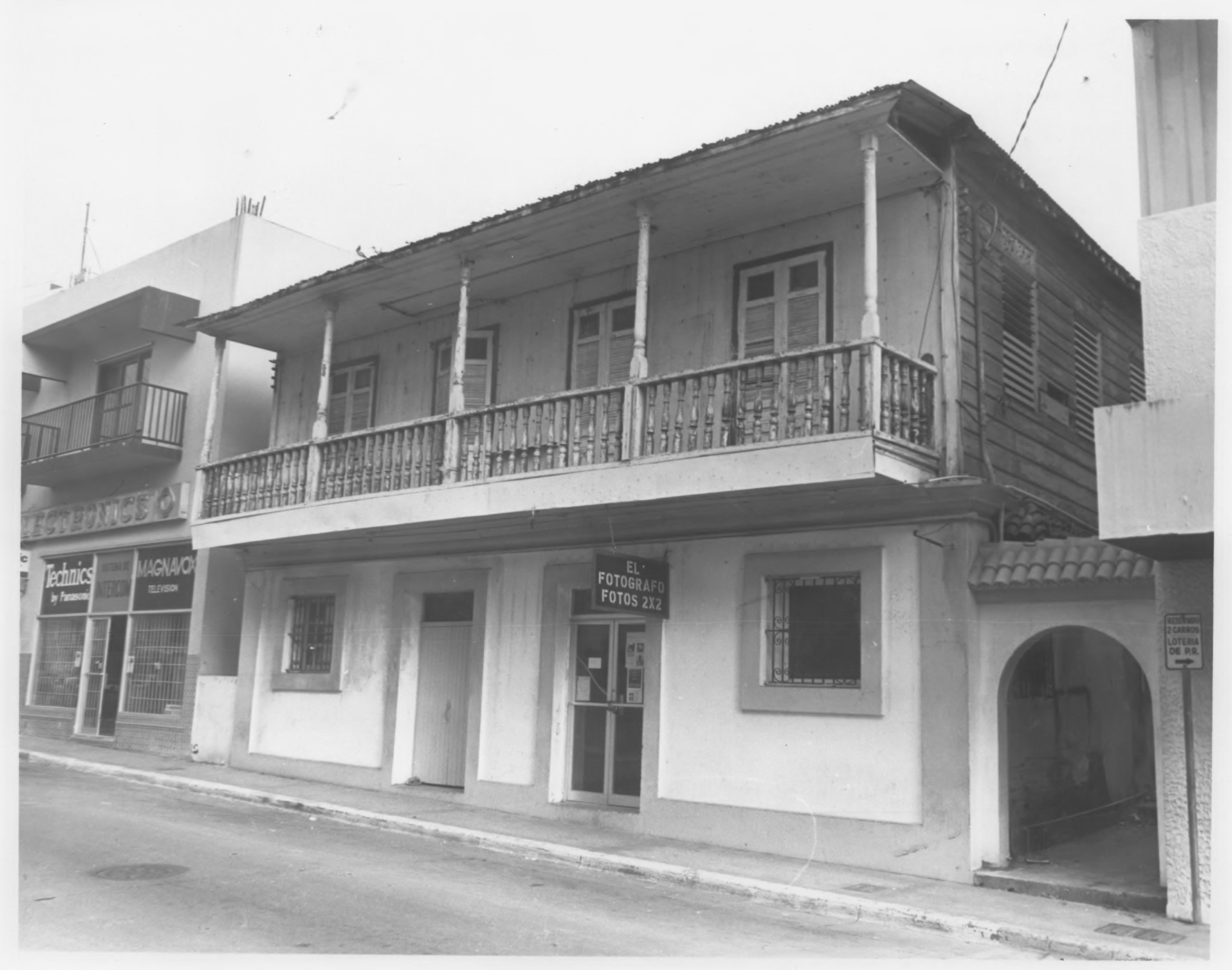
- View of the building in 1987.

- Location within Puerto Rico
- Location: 61 Gonzalo Marín Street downtown Arecibo, Puerto Rico
- Coordinates: 18°28′19″N 66°42′54″W
- Built: 1860
- Architectural style: Spanish Colonial
- NRHP reference No.: 88000645
- RNSZH No.: 2000-(RN)-20-JP-SH

Significant dates
- Added to NRHP: April 13, 1988
- Designated RNSZH: December 21, 2000

Gonzalo Marín 61 (also known as the Abreu Residence) is a historic building located in the historic and administrative center of Arecibo, Puerto Rico. It was added to the United States National Register of Historic Places on October 19, 1986, and to the Puerto Rico Register of Historic Sites and Zones in 2000. Although an exact date of construction cannot be determined, based on historic photographs of the area, it can be said that the structure already existed on this lot by 1860. The historic building is currently abandoned.

The Abreu Residence is a two-story, masonry and wood, commercial and residential building on the south side of Gonzalo Marin Street, in the historic center of Arecibo. The base level is of stuccoed load-bearing masonry and the main, upped floor is of timber and clapboard construction. The composition consists of four bays, spaced evenly and symmetrically at both the ground and upper stories. At the commercial base level, two central rectangular entrance bays are flanked by smaller, square window openings. Each opening is articulated by heavy, planar, masonry surrounds. Bay number two contains original, wooden, double doors with glass transoms, but bay number 3 has been altered to house aluminum and glass commercial doors. A planar pilaster strip frames the east and west extremes of the ground-floor. A continuous base mold and a simple cornice delineate the lower and upper limits of the masonry base-story, respectively.

Although there is no documentation as to the original appearance of the house, it can be assumed from the prototype that the facade remains true to the original form and that an original, ceramics tile roof was replaced by metallic sheets during the early twentieth century. Traces of the ceramic tile are visible from the interior, above the timber construction.
