= Residencia Doña Antonia Ramírez =

Historic building in Dorado, Puerto Rico

- U.S. National Register of Historic Places
- Puerto Rico Historic Sites and Zones
- Location within Puerto Rico
- Location: Highway 693, km 7 Maguayo, Dorado, Puerto Rico
- Coordinates: 18°27′35″N 66°15′42″W
- Built: 1921
- Architect: Camilo Muñoz
- Architectural style: Italianate
- NRHP reference No.: 88001847
- RNSZH No.: 2000-(RMSJ)-00-JP-SH

Significant dates
- Added to NRHP: October 11, 1988
- Designated RNSZH: February 3, 2000

The Doña Antonia Ramírez Residence (Spanish: Residencia Doña Antonia Ramírez), also known as the Hernández Residence (Residencia Hernández), is a historic Italianate-style residential building located in the Maguayo barrio of Dorado, Puerto Rico. The house was added to the United States National Register of Historic Places in 1988, and to the Puerto Rico Register of Historic Sites and Zones in 2000.

The lands where the house was built had been farmlands since at least 1896. The architectural plan, dated September 16, 1921, implies that the part of the house sporting an octagon was built by 1921, when the back part of the house was added.
