= Brunet–Calaf Residence =

Building in Manatí, Puerto Rico listed on the US National Register of Historic Places

- Brunet-Calaf Residence
- U.S. National Register of Historic Places
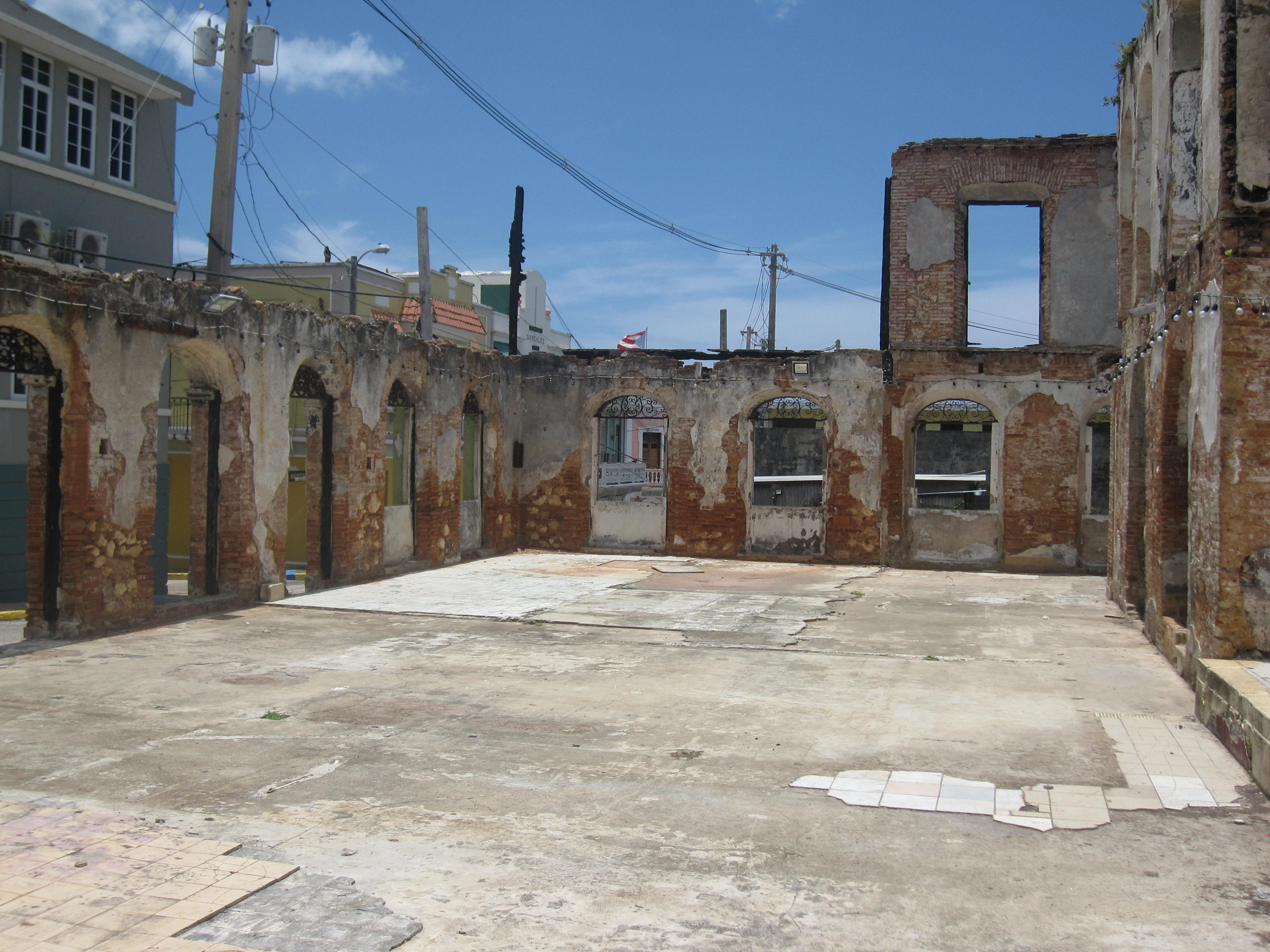
- The ruined residence in 2019.

- Location within Puerto Rico
- Location: Corner of Quiñones and Patriota Pozo Streets, Manatí, Puerto Rico
- Coordinates: 18°25′39″N 66°29′34″W
- Built: 1850
- NRHP reference No.: 88001306
- Added to NRHP: September 1, 1988

The Brunet–Calaf Residence (Spanish: Residencia Brunet–Calaf) is a historic structure and former residence located in the historic center of the Puerto Rican municipality of Manatí. The residence was added to the United States National Register of Historic Places in 1988. The house, along with a portion of the city hall of Manatí, was destroyed by a fire in 2016.

The Brunet-Calaf House occupied the western third of a block next to the church and the main plaza of Manatí. It had two stories, the lower one dedicated to commercial uses and the upper one residential. This building agglutinates a diversity of stylistic tendencies which were common to Manatí's architectural history between 1850 and 1910. Its irregular massing and proportioning are made up with the different architectural history borne out by local builders and artisans whose names have long been forgotten. It well can be said that the Brunet-Calaf House is a compendium of the towns evolving building and crafts tradition during the second half of the nineteenth century.

== Gallery ==
Residence remnants in 2019.

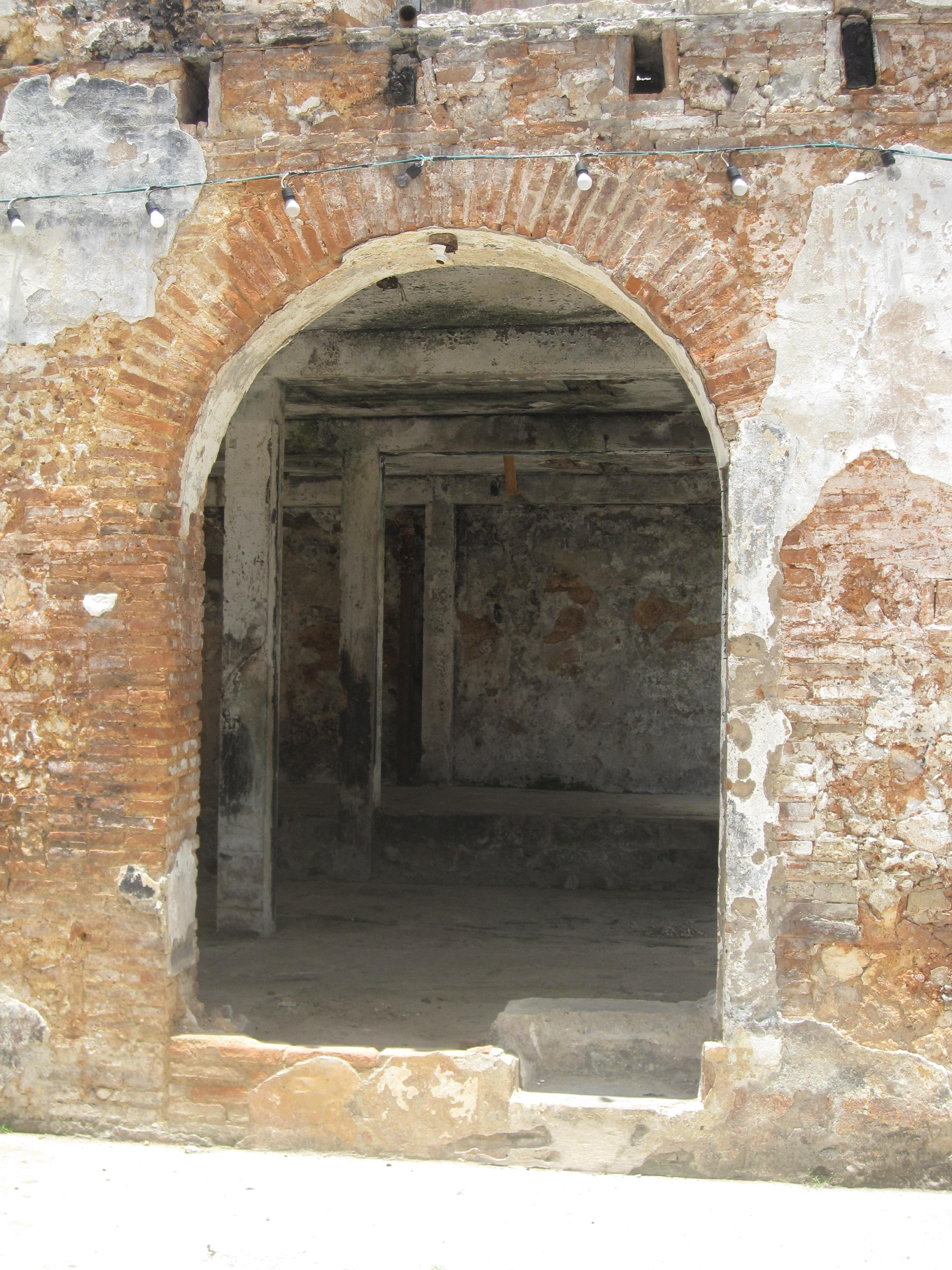

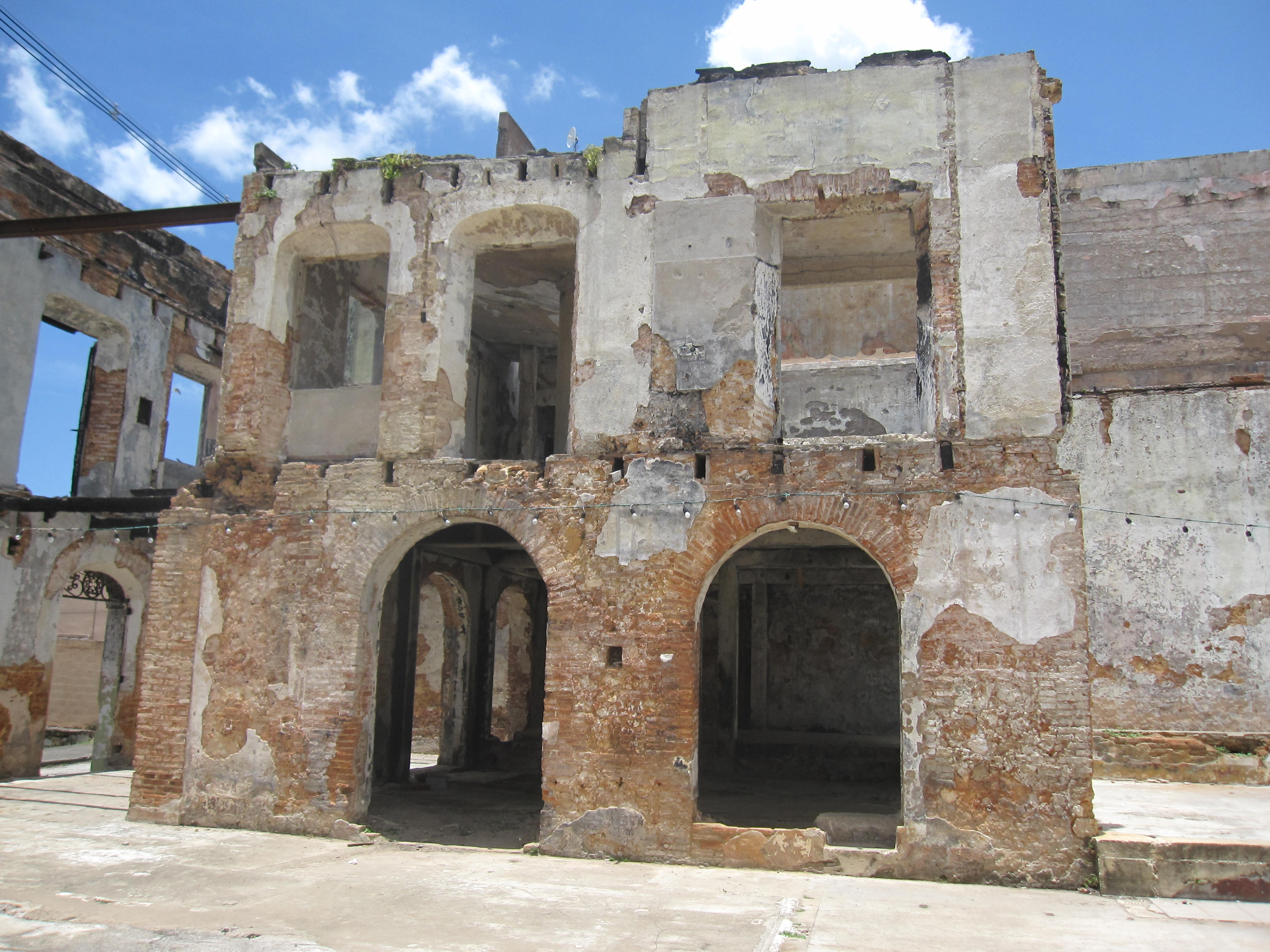

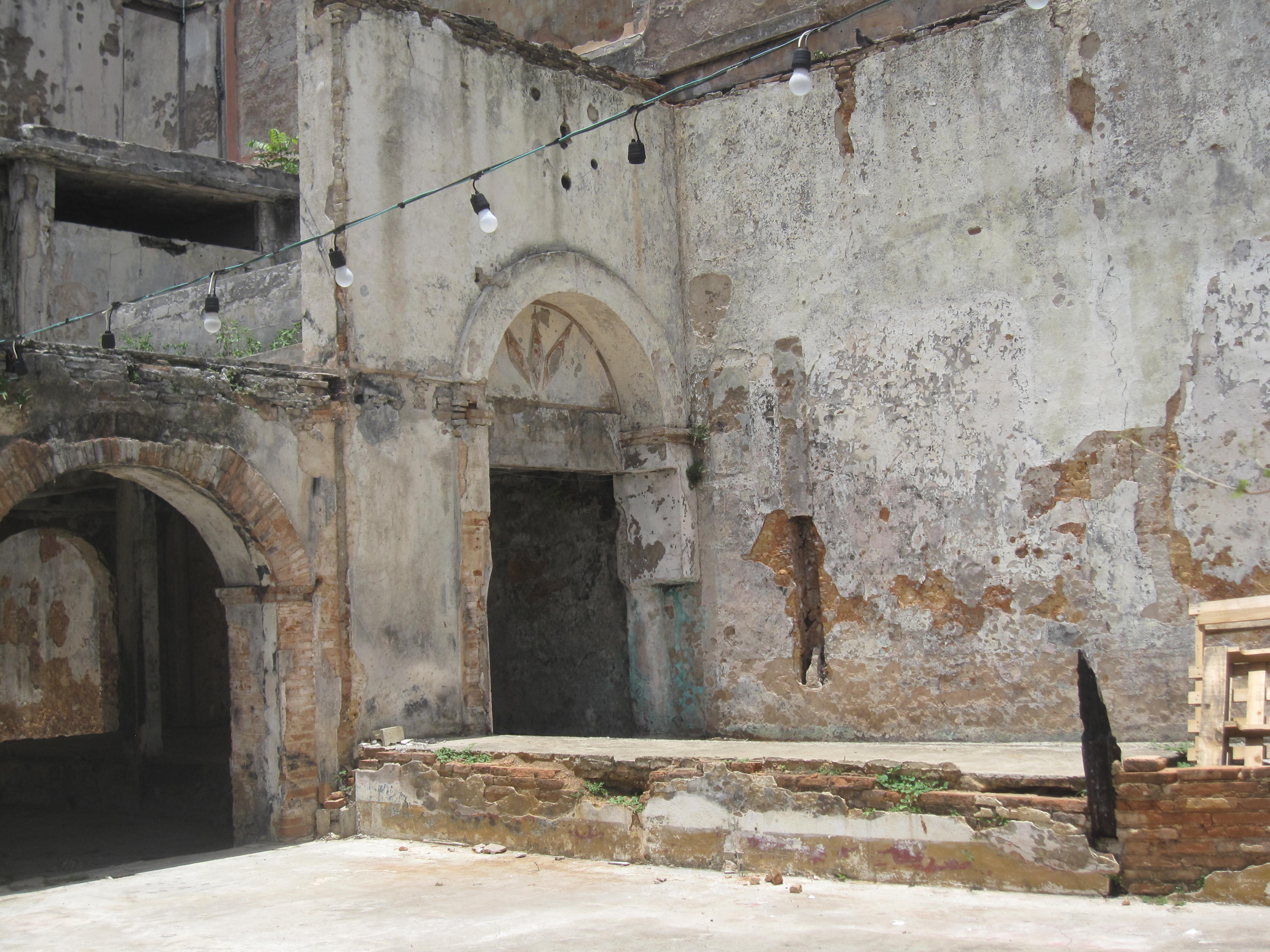

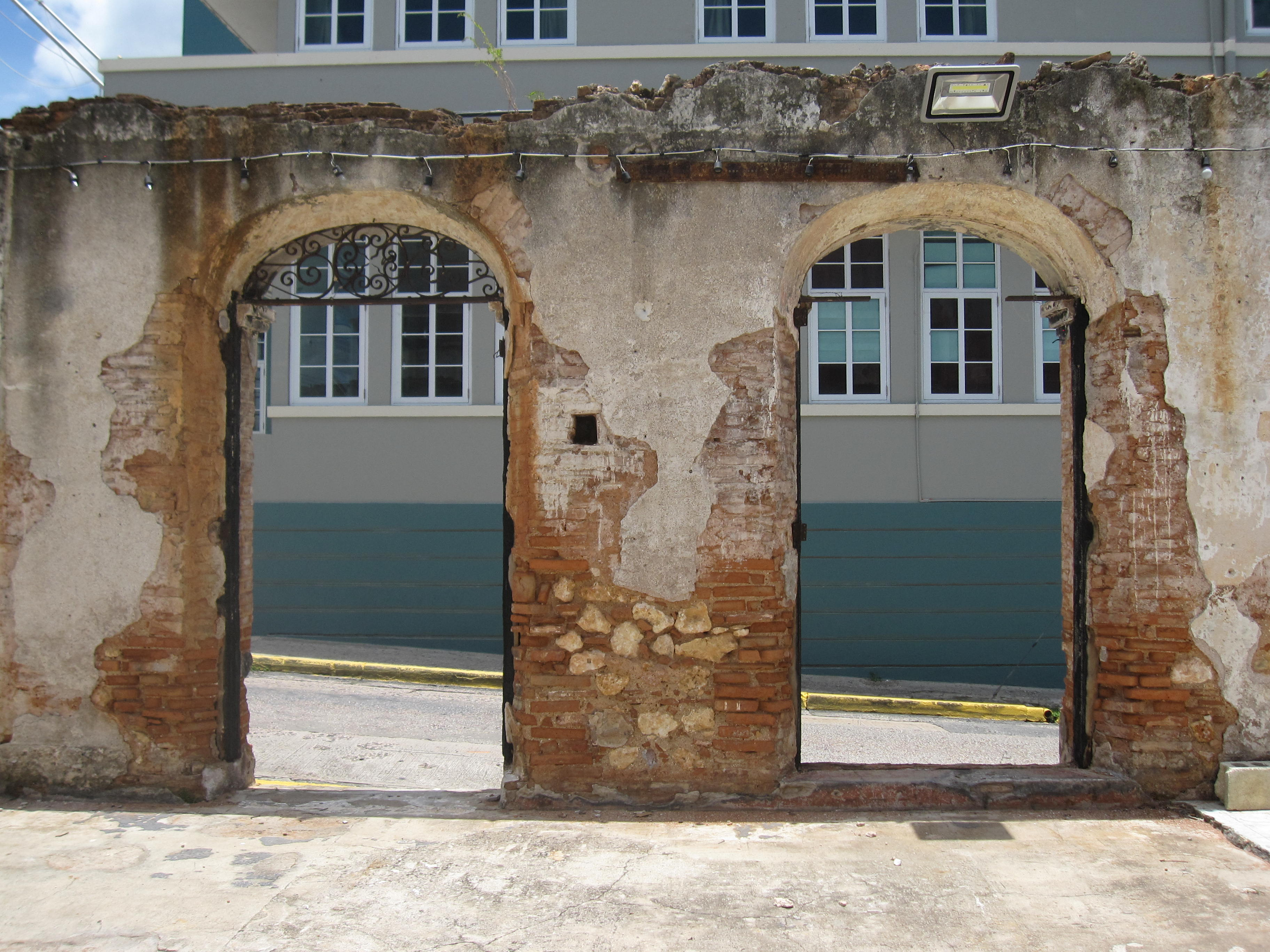

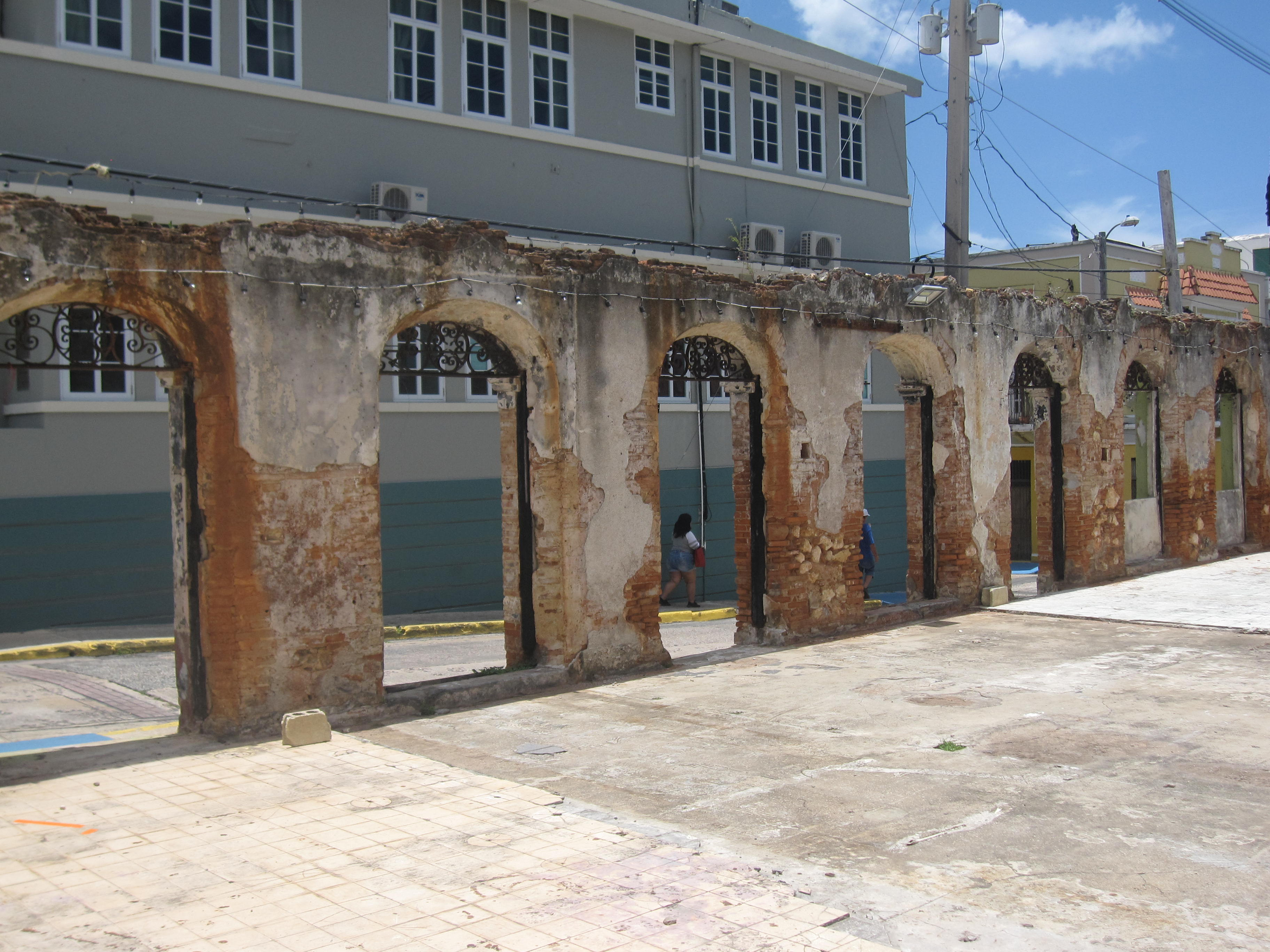

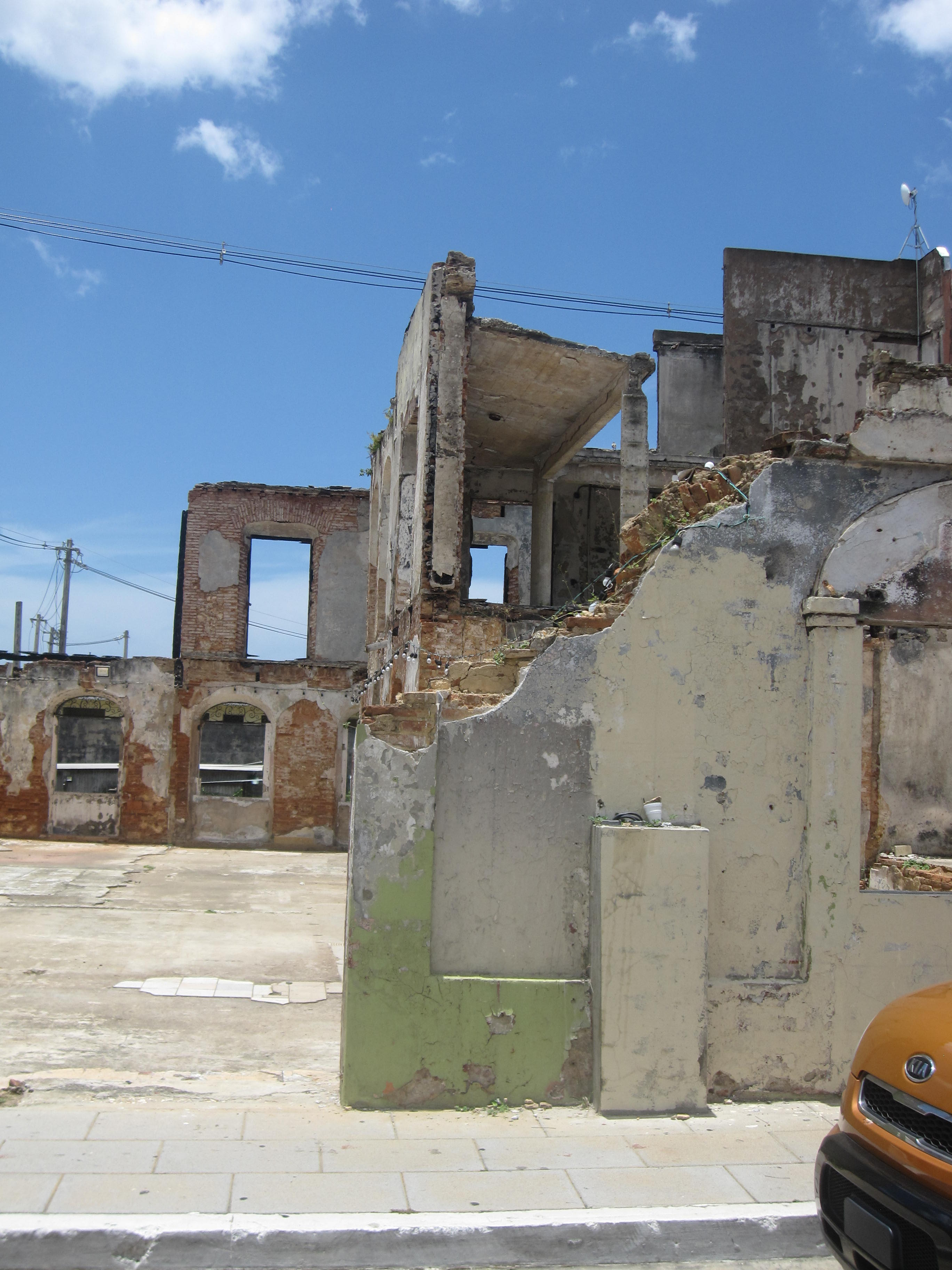

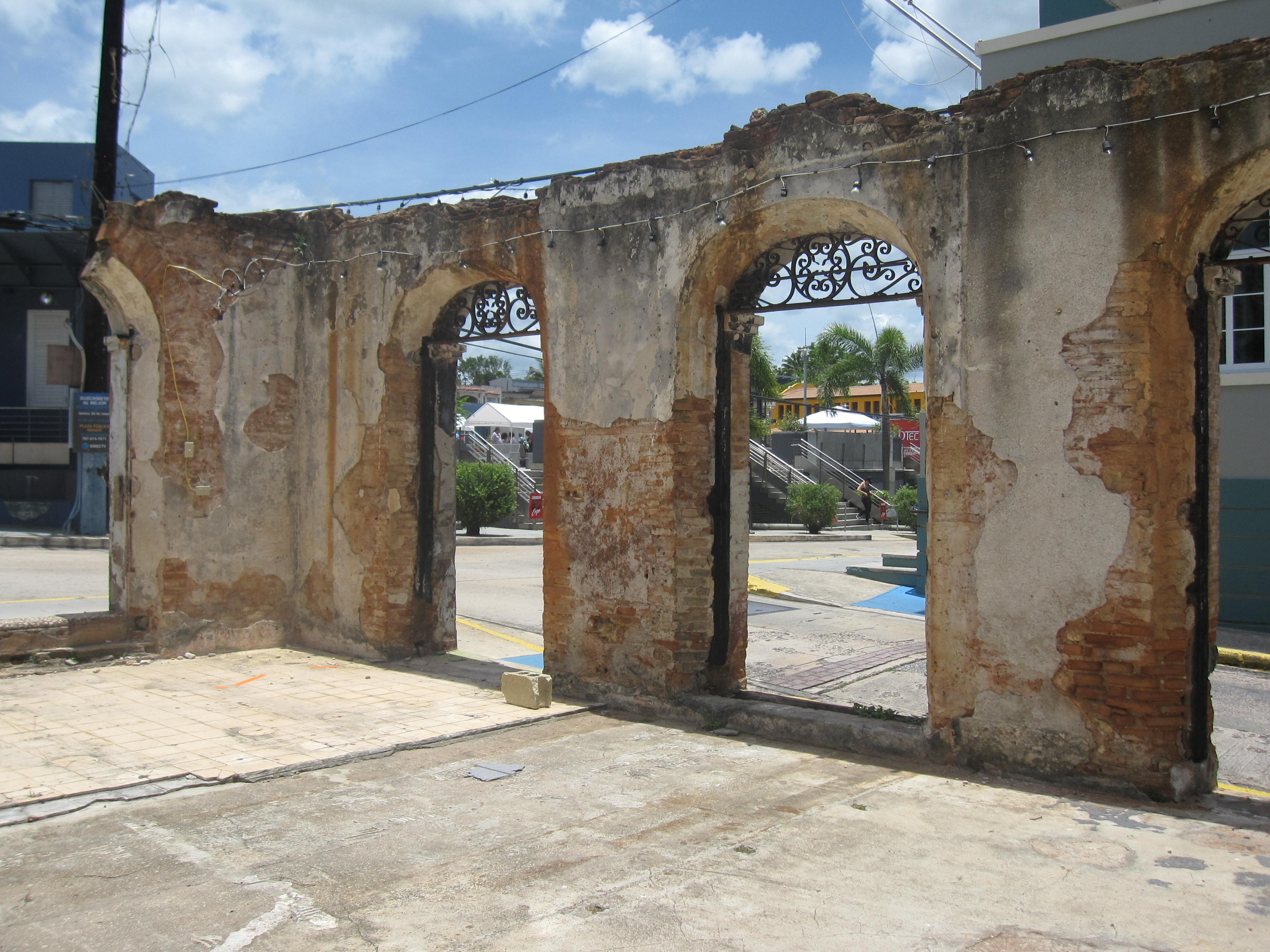

== See also ==
- Plaza del Mercado de Manatí
