= Teatro Liberty =

- U.S. National Register of Historic Places
- Puerto Rico Historic Sites and Zones
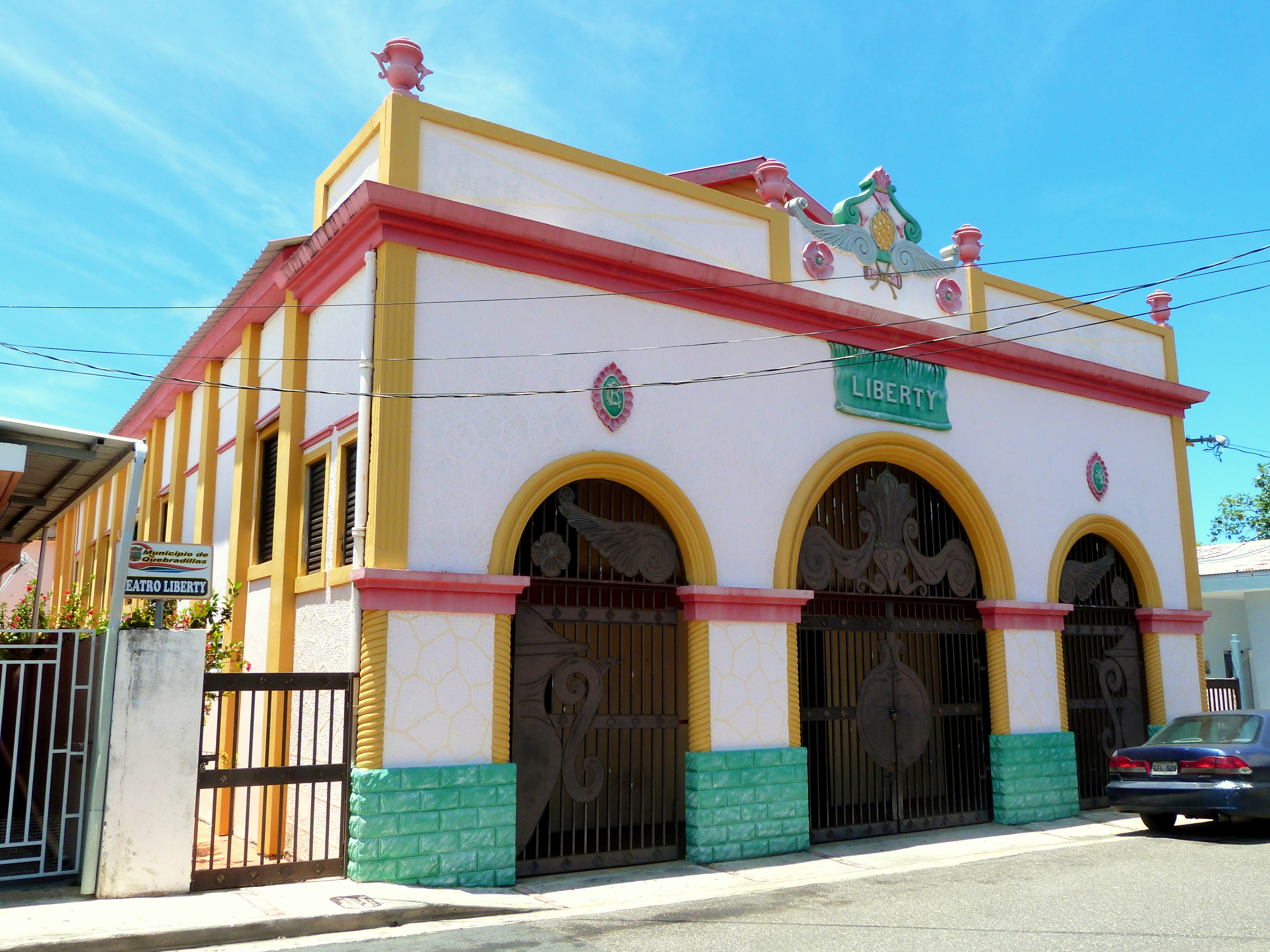
- Teatro Liberty in 2017.

- Location within Puerto Rico
- Location: 157 Rafols Street Quebradillas, Puerto Rico
- Coordinates: 18°28′24″N 66°56′21″W
- Built: 1921
- Architect: Arcilio Rosa
- Architectural style: Spanish Colonial Revival
- NRHP reference No.: 88000963
- RNSZH No.: 2000-(RN)-20-JP-SH

Significant dates
- Added to NRHP: May 4, 1989
- Designated RNSZH: December 21, 2000

Teatro Liberty is a historic theater and performing arts venue located in Quebradillas Pueblo, the administrative and historic center of the municipality of Quebradillas, Puerto Rico. It was designed by Arcilio Rosa as both a music venue and a silent movie theater. It was the first venue of its kind to be built in Quebradillas and it hosted numerous musical events popular at the time such as zarzuelas and operettas, in addition to classical Spanish plays. The theater has been listed in the National Register of Historic Places since 1989 and on the Puerto Rico Register of Historic Sites and Zones since 2000 for being a prime example of the 1920s architecture cultural and performing arts venues vernacular architecture in the island that is highly inspired by Spanish Colonial architecture. It preserves its architectural integrity and was last restored in 1978 with upgrades being made to the lobby and main stage.

== See also ==
- National Register of Historic Places listings in northern Puerto Rico
