= Farmacia Serra =

- U.S. National Register of Historic Places
- Puerto Rico Historic Sites and Zones
- Location within Puerto Rico
- Location: 11 Calle Degetau; Bayamón, Puerto Rico
- Coordinates: 18°23′57″N 66°09′20″W
- Built: 1910
- Architectural style: Late 19th And 20th Century Revivals, Italian Renaissance
- NRHP reference No.: 88000685
- RNSZH No.: 2000-(RMSJ)-00-JP-SH

Significant dates
- Added to NRHP: May 4, 1989
- Designated RNSZH: February 3, 2000

Farmacia Serra is a building close to the plaza of Bayamón, Puerto Rico which was built in 1910. It was listed on the National Register of Historic Places in 1989, and on the Puerto Rico Register of Historic Sites and Zones in 2000.

It was the first in a chain of Serra drugstores eventually opened by Luis Serra. He and his family lived upstairs.

It was the site of tertulias, meetings "of the town's politicians and intellectuals to discuss the latest events and decide what action could be taken."

It has "exhuberant [sic] ornamentation" in its "modernismo" or Romantic Eclectic architecture.
