= La Colectiva Tabacalera =

- U.S. National Register of Historic Places
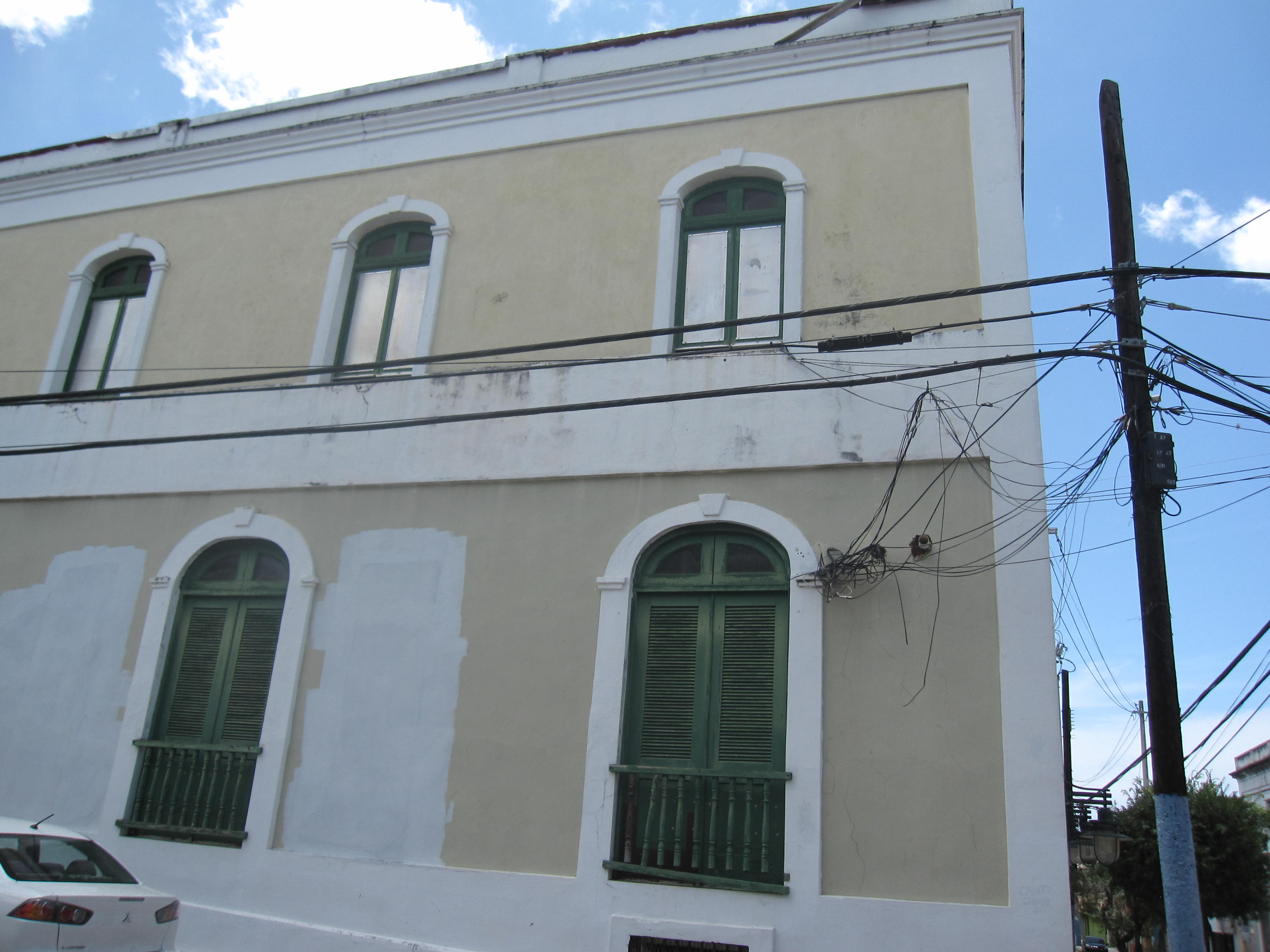
- The building in 2019.

- Location within Puerto Rico
- Location: 18 Quiñones Street, Manatí, Puerto Rico
- Coordinates: 18°25′40″N 66°29′31″W
- Built: 1880, 1920
- NRHP reference No.: 88001305
- Added to NRHP: September 1, 1988

La Colectiva Tabacalera (Spanish for The Tobacco Collective) is a historic building located in the historical center of the Puerto Rican municipality of Manatí. It has had many uses throughout its history, and it was added to the United States National Register of Historic Places in 1988. It is a two-story combination of two buildings.

== Gallery ==
Exterior of the building in 2019.

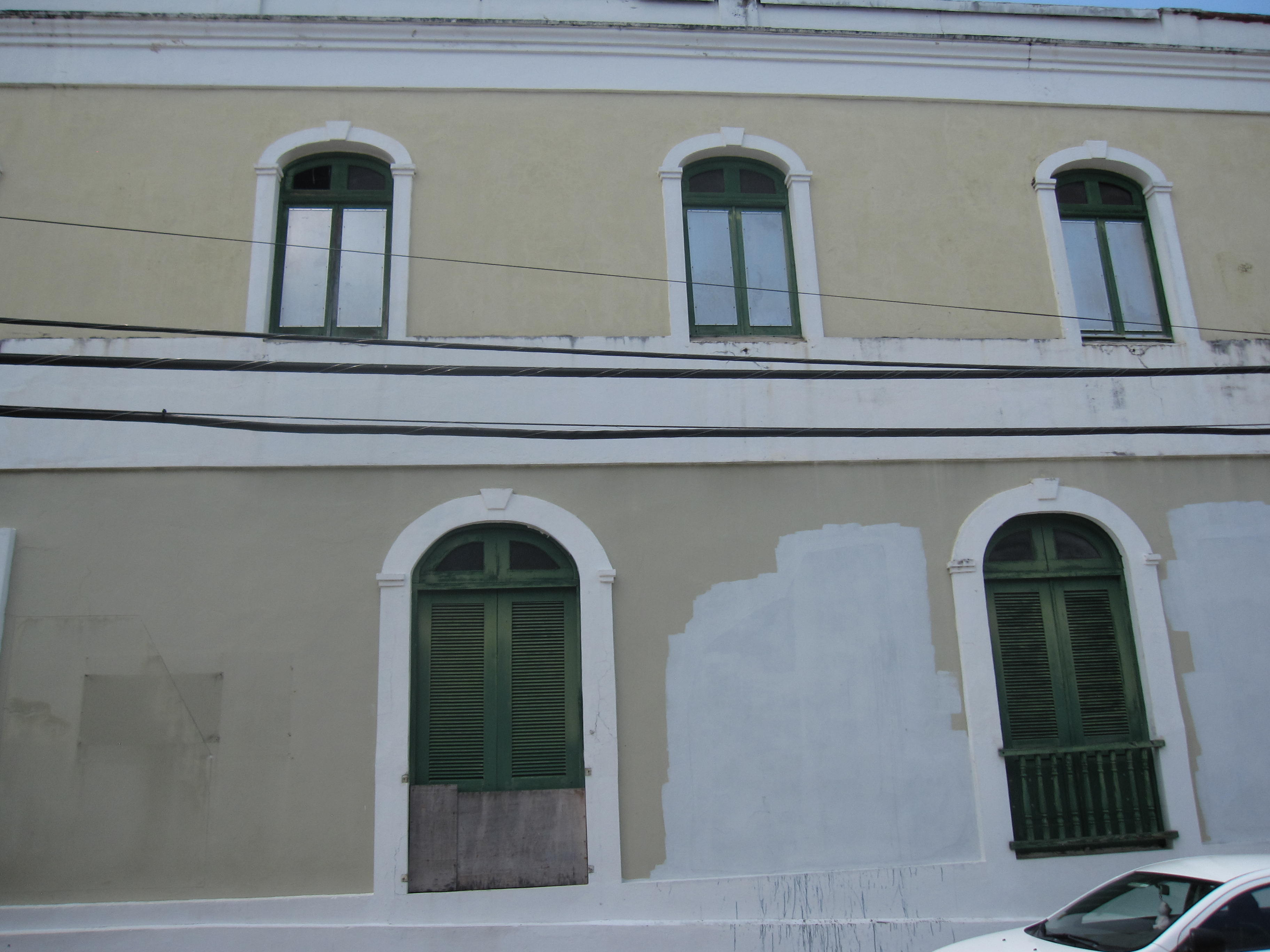

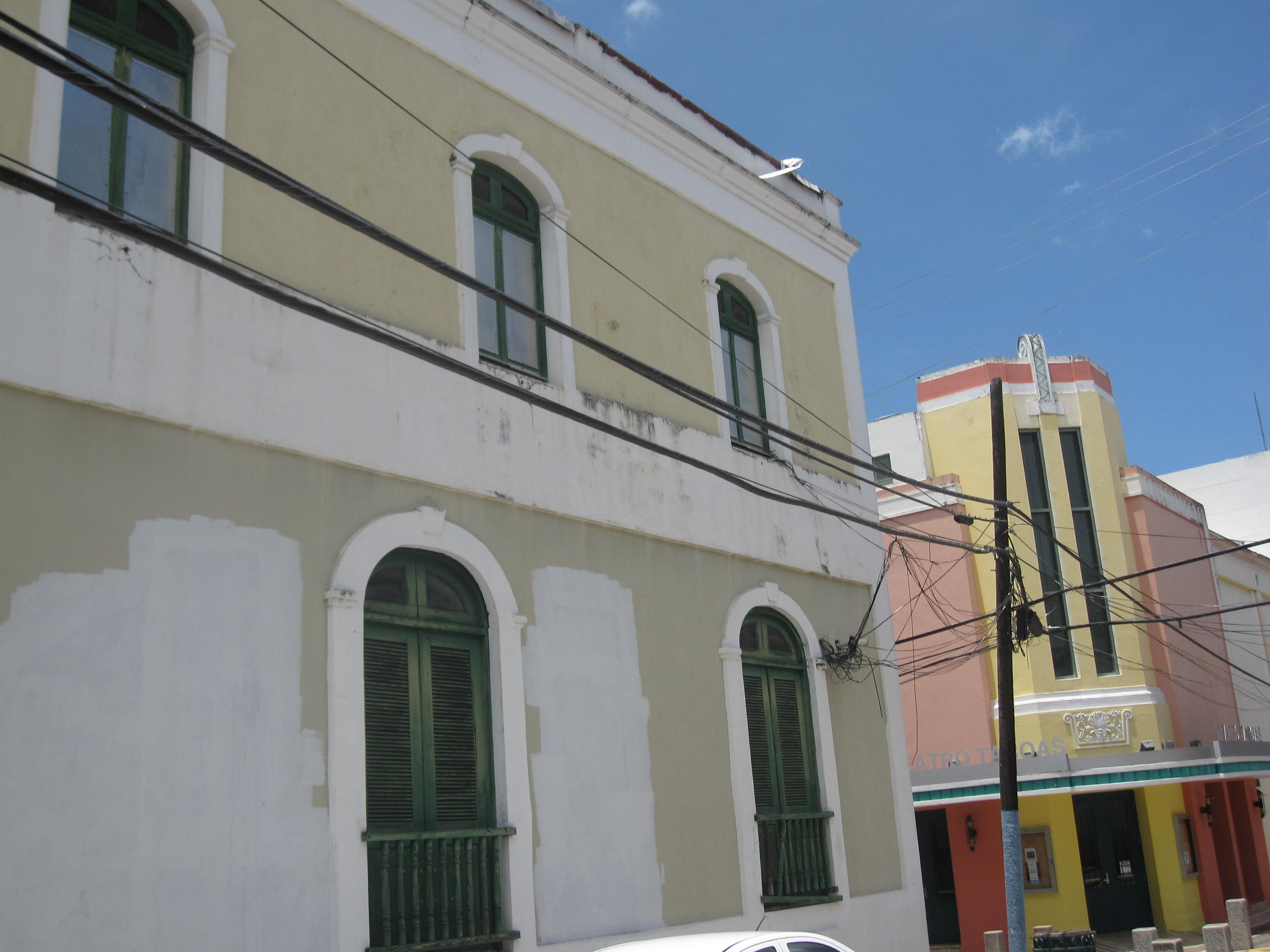

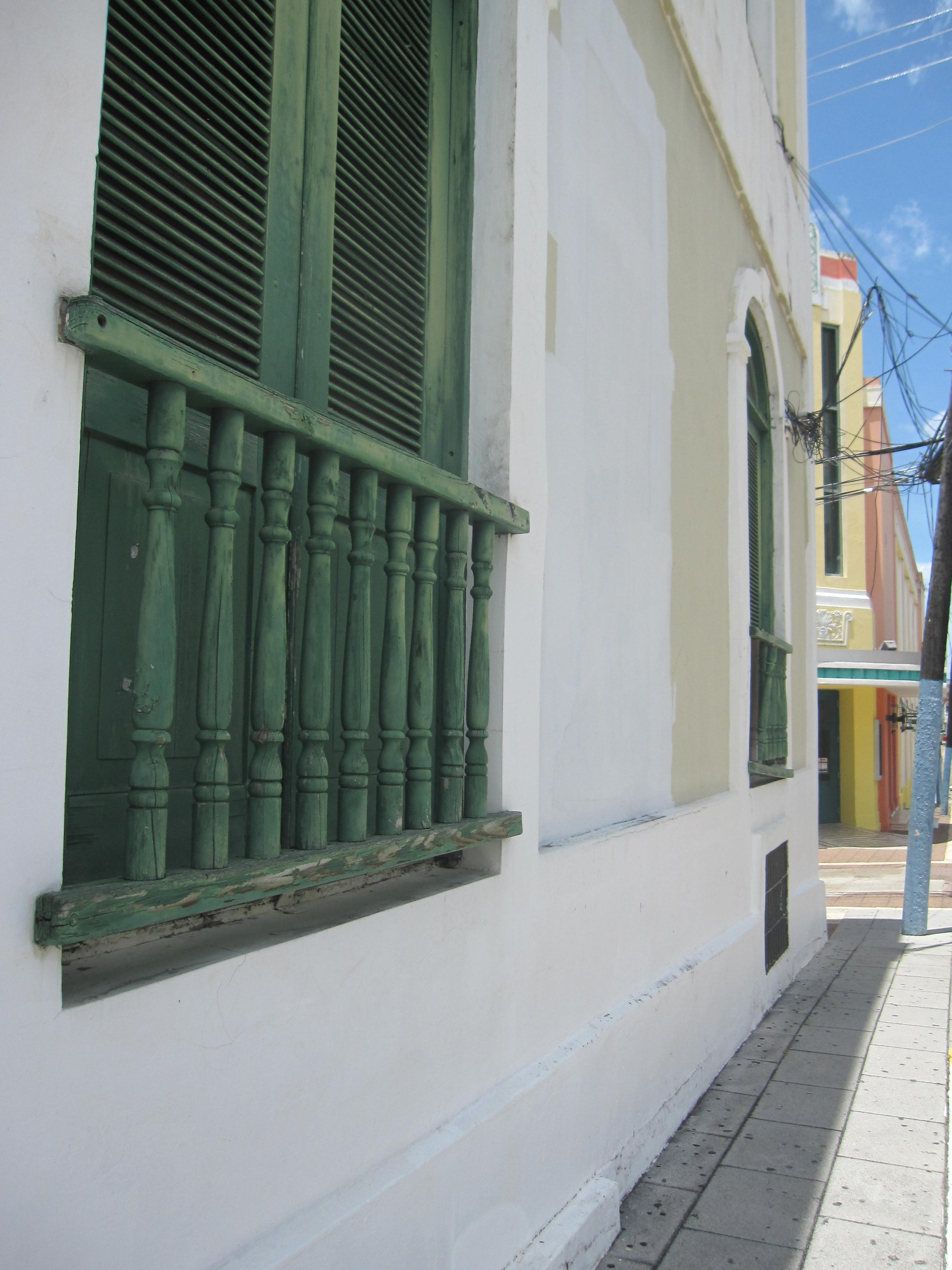

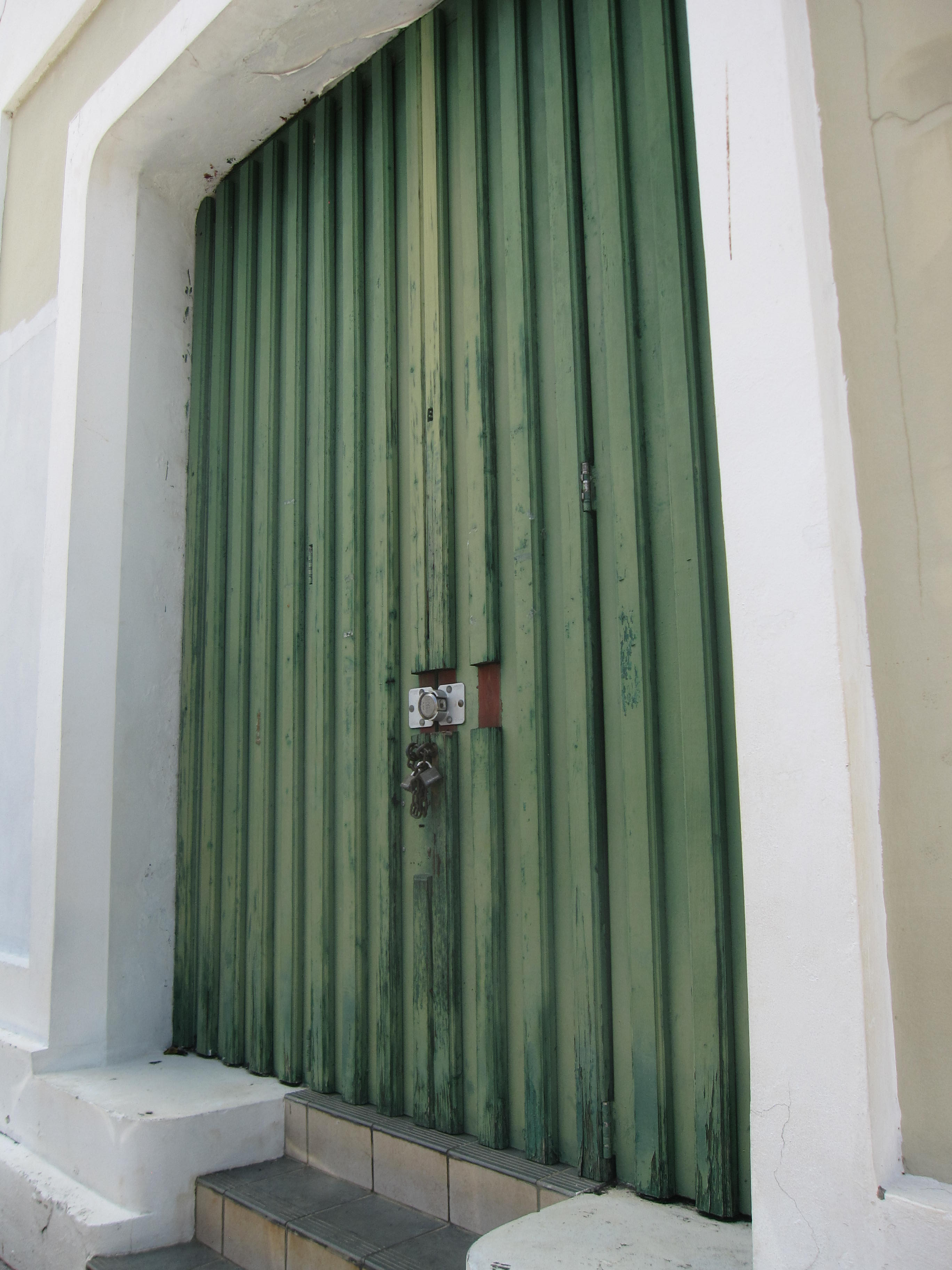

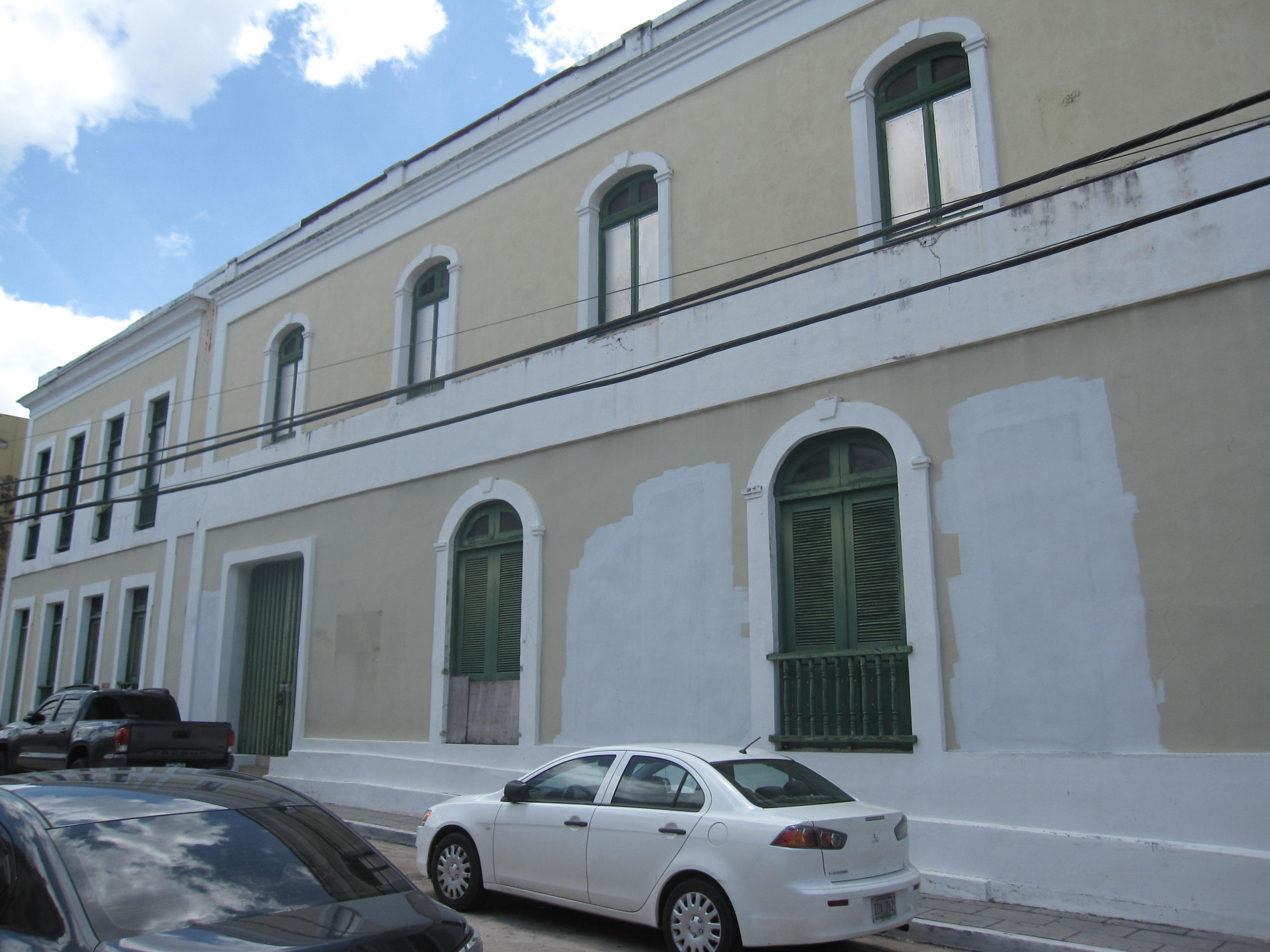

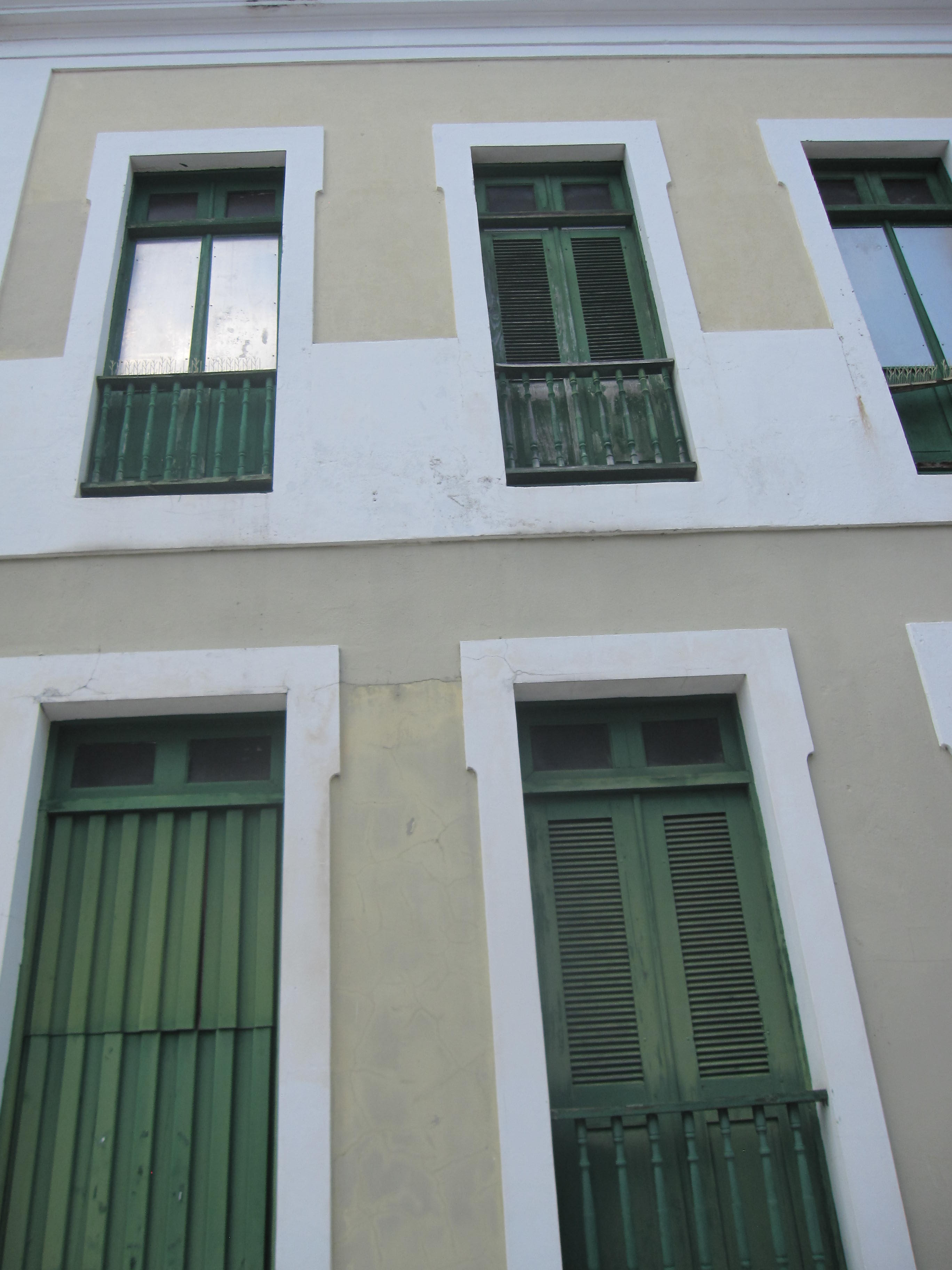
