= De Luxe Florida =

Historic factory building in Florida, Puerto Rico

- U.S. National Register of Historic Places
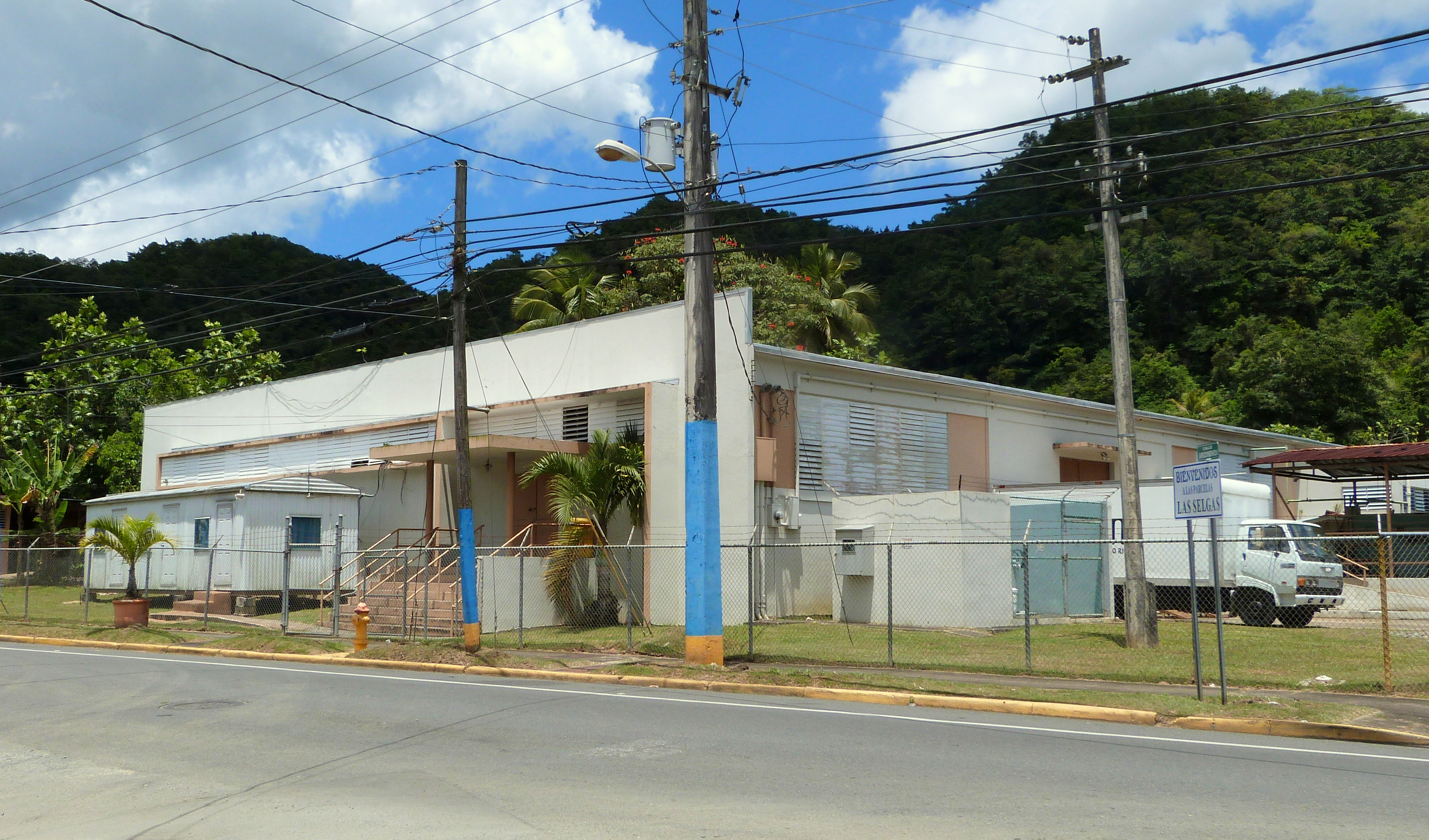
- De Luxe Caribe 2017

- Location within Puerto Rico
- Location: Highway 642, km 11.1 Florida, Puerto Rico
- Coordinates: 18°27′35″N 66°15′42″W
- Built: 1958
- Architect: René O. Ramírez
- Architectural style: Modernist
- NRHP reference No.: 12000935
- Added to NRHP: November 14, 2012

De Luxe Florida Manufacturing Plant (Spanish: Fábrica de Fomento De Luxe Florida), also known as the De Luxe Caribe Inc. Building (Edificio De Luxe Caribe Inc.), is a historic factory building located in Florida, Puerto Rico. The building was added to the United States National Register of Historic Places in 2012 as it is a prime example of the early prototypes for manufacturing plants in Puerto Rico.

The factory consists of plant number T-0472-0-58 and its addition labeled T-0472-0-66. This is one of three prototypical buildings at a small-sized industrial park located northeast of town, alongside Road PR-642, Kilometer 11.1. The L-shaped plant was designed by architect René O. Ramírez, one of Puerto Rico's early Modern architects. Built in steel and concrete, with an A-frame supported above concrete beams and columns, the property embodies stylistic considerations pertaining to the Modern Movement in architecture. The De Luxe Florida/Caribe still incorporates all key components identifiable with the manufacturing building as originally designed and built.
