= Hacienda La Sabana =

Historic place in Camuy, Puerto Rico

- U.S. National Register of Historic Places
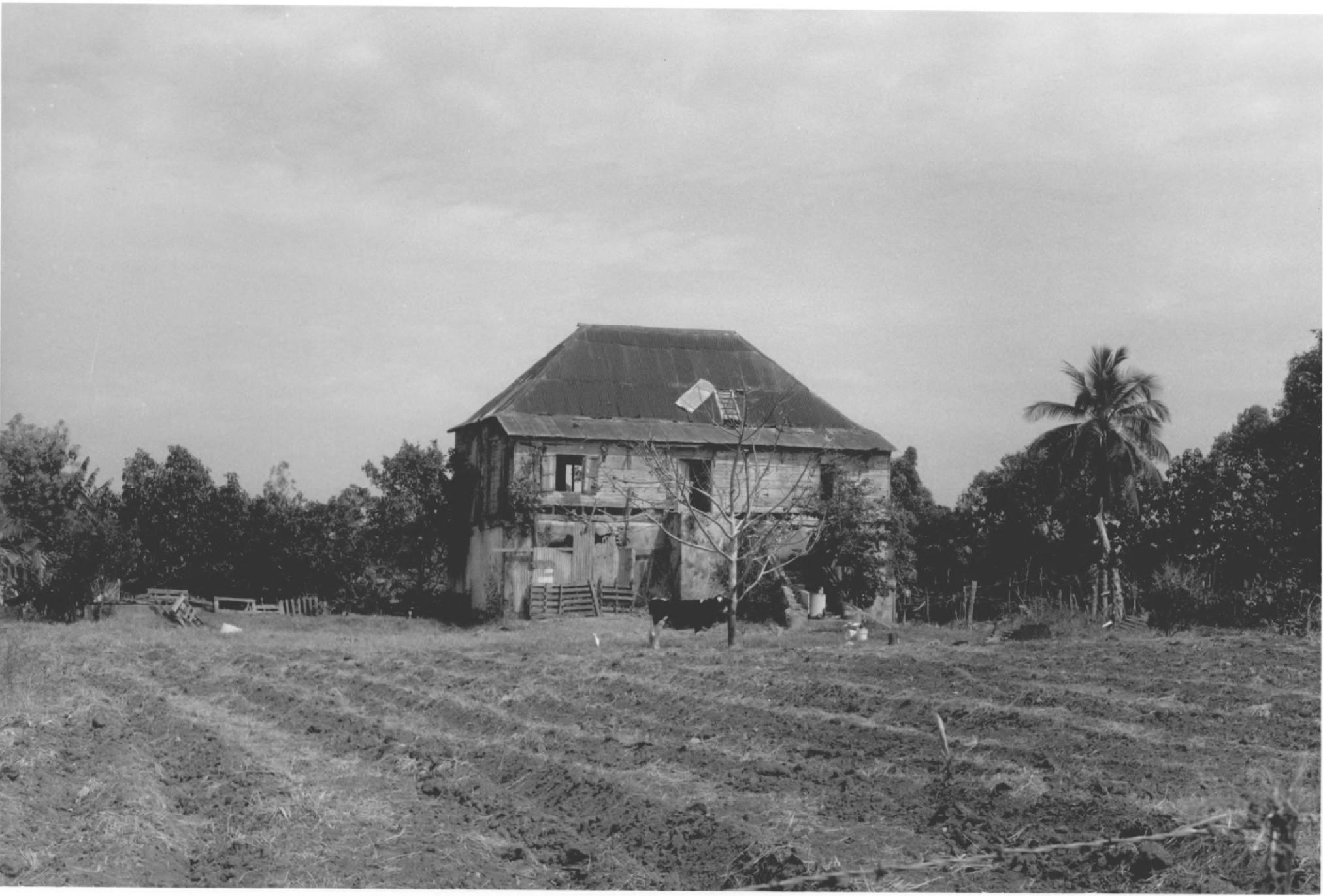
- Photographed in 1983

- Location within Puerto Rico
- Nearest city: Camuy, Puerto Rico
- Coordinates: 18°27′12″N 66°53′4″W
- Built: c.1773
- NRHP reference No.: 85000295
- Added to NRHP: February 14, 1985

Hacienda La Sabana near Camuy, Puerto Rico, was built in c. 1773 for Don Gregorio Rodriguez. It was listed on the National Register of Historic Places in 1985.

It is a two-story building that served both as a residence and for storage. It is located in the middle of a "sabana" between the Camuy River and the Guajataca River. Its north side faces the old main road, the Camino Real.

It was in deteriorated condition in 1983.
