= Casa Córdova =

Historic house in Arecibo, Puerto Rico

- U.S. National Register of Historic Places
- Puerto Rico Historic Sites and Zones
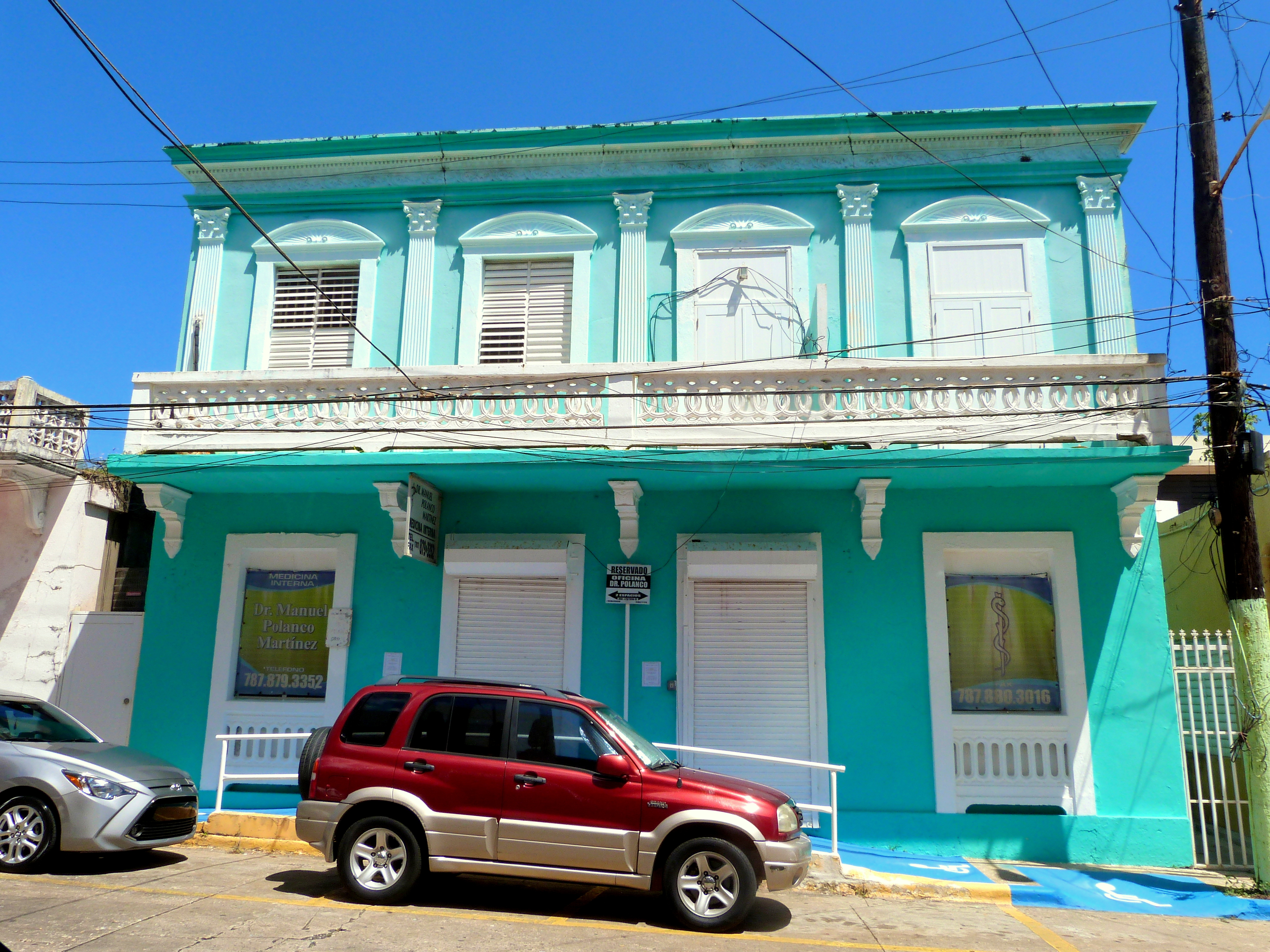
- Casa Córdova in 2017.

- Location within Puerto Rico
- Location: 14 Gonzalo Marín Street Arecibo, Puerto Rico
- Coordinates: 18°28′21″N 66°42′49″W
- Built: 1898
- Architectural style: Classical Revival, Beaux Arts
- NRHP reference No.: 86003185
- RNSZH No.: 2000-(RN)-20-JP-SH

Significant dates
- Added to NRHP: November 17, 1986
- Designated RNSZH: December 21, 2000

Casa Córdova, also known as Casa de las Conchas (Spanish for 'seashell house'), is a historic building located at 14 Gonzalo Marín Street in the historic center of the Puerto Rican municipality of Arecibo. The historic residence, now a commercial building, was added to the United States National Register of Historic Places on November 17, 1986, and to the Puerto Rico Register of Historic Sites and Zones in 2000.

The wood and brick commercial-residence building was built in 1898 during a period of architectural transition inspired by Neoclassical and Beaux-Arts styles.
