= Casa Ulanga =

- U.S. National Register of Historic Places
- Puerto Rico Historic Sites and Zones
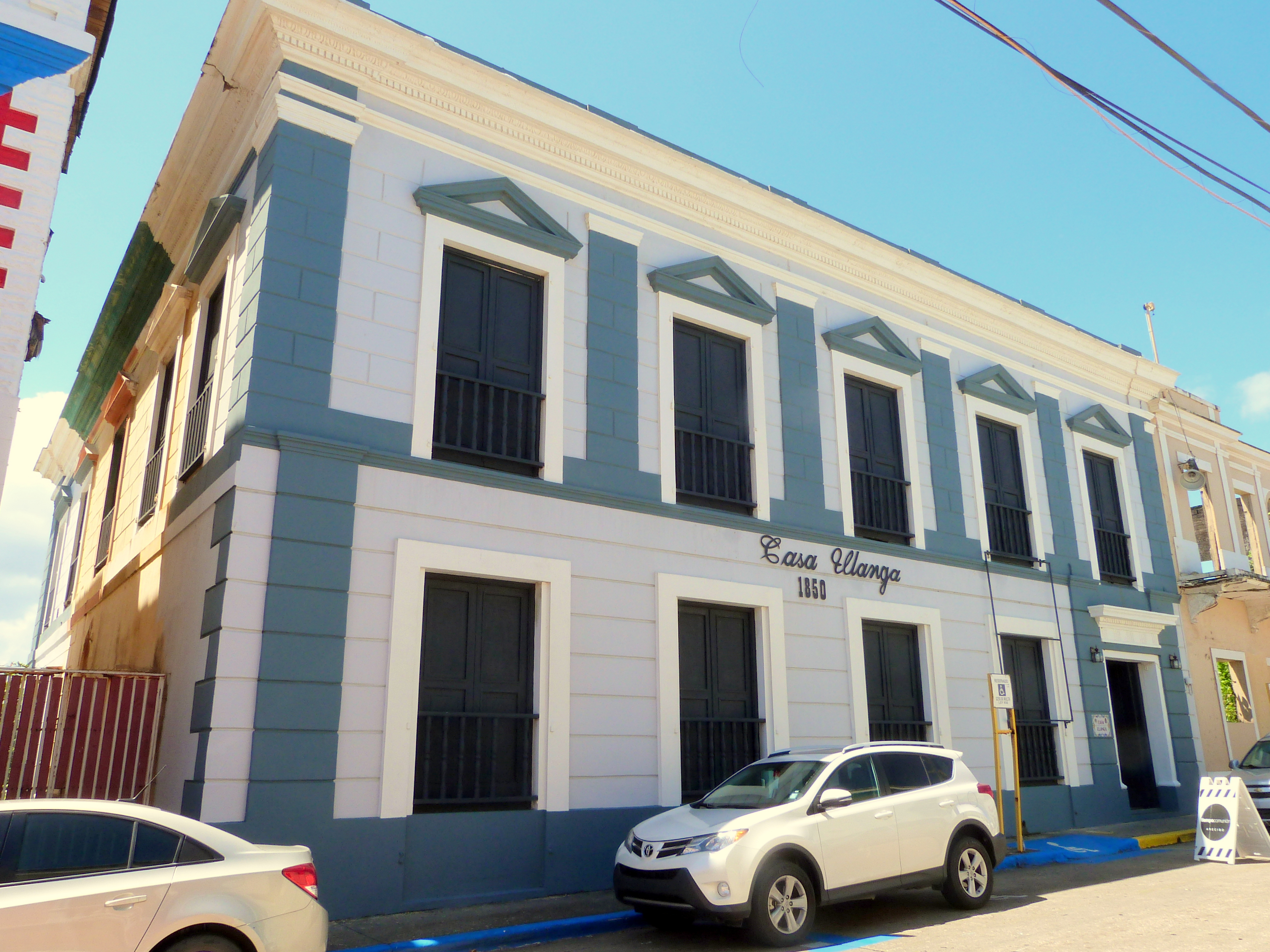
- Casa Ulanga in 2017.

- Location within Puerto Rico
- Location: 7 Gonzalo Marín Street Arecibo, Puerto Rico
- Coordinates: 18°28′21″N 66°42′49″W
- Built: 1850
- NRHP reference No.: 82003822
- RNSZH No.: 2000-(RN)-20-JP-SH

Significant dates
- Added to NRHP: July 26, 1982
- Designated RNSZH: December 21, 2000

Casa Ulanga, also known as the former Superior Court of Arecibo (Spanish: Antiguo Tribunal Superior de Arecibo), is a historic building located at 7 Gonzalo Marín Street in the historic center of the Puerto Rican municipality of Arecibo. Due to its historic and architectural importance the building was added to the United States National Register of Historic Places on July 26, 1982, and to the Puerto Rico Register of Historic Sites and Zones in 2000.

== History ==
Originally constructed as a dwelling for Don Francisco Ulanga in 1850, its prominent location near the town square, and its three-story construction made the building notable and important to the historical development of Arecibo. The structure housed the family residence in its first and second stories. The basement level, facing Ariosto Cruz Street, was the locale for a bank and a trade center. Throughout its history the building was also used as a store, a hospital, a jail, municipal offices and, currently, a cultural center known as the Arecibo House of Culture (Casa de la Cultura Arecibeña).
