= Palacio del Marqués de las Claras =

Historic building in Arecibo, Puerto Rico

- U.S. National Register of Historic Places
- Puerto Rico Historic Sites and Zones
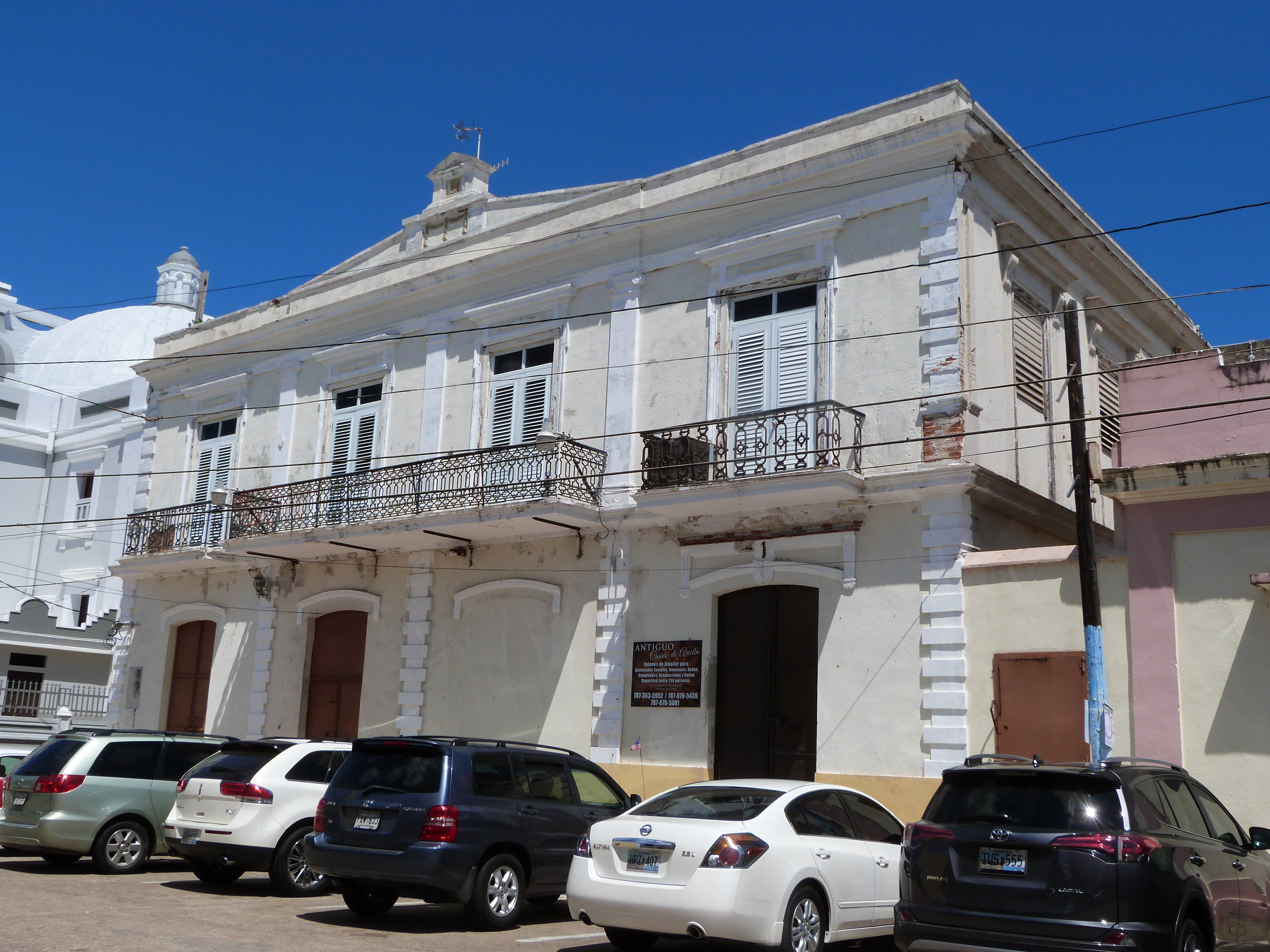
- Palacio del Marqués de las Claras in 2017

- Location within Puerto Rico
- Location: Calle Gonzalo Marin #58, Arecibo, Puerto Rico 00612
- Coordinates: 18°28′24″N 66°42′53″W
- Area: less than one acre
- Built: 1878
- Architectural style: Neoclassic
- NRHP reference No.: 88000964
- RNSZH No.: 2000-(RN)-20-JP-SH

Significant dates
- Added to NRHP: July 12, 1988
- Designated RNSZH: December 21, 2000

Palacio del Marqués de las Claras or Casino de Arecibo, as it is also known, was built in 1888 by Fernando Fernández Umpierre, Marqués de las Claras. At the end of the 19th century, the Marqués de las Claras distinguished himself as one of the most prominent and wealthy owners of sugar estates in Puerto Rico. He was known for his sponsorship of the arts and cultural events.

After the death of the Marqués in 1896, the palace, located in Arecibo barrio-pueblo, became the meeting place of the aristocratic elite of Arecibo. It was the meeting place for the conservative politicians of Puerto Rico, a place to discuss the politics related to the finance and government administration during the Spanish colonial period in Puerto Rico. Currently, the palace is a venue for important social activities. It was listed on the National Register of Historic Places in 1988, and on the Puerto Rico Register of Historic Sites and Zones in 2000.

The neoclassical design of the facade makes use of ornamentation to differentiate the piano nobile (the principal floor) of the palace from the first floor. The second level is elegant and refined. The asymmetric entry stands out slightly with ornamental detail.
