= List of churches in the Archdiocese of San Juan =

This is a list of current and former Roman Catholic churches in the Archdiocese of San Juan in Puerto Rico. The jurisdiction of the archdiocese includes the capital city of San Juan and the core municipalities of its metropolitan area: Bayamón, Carolina, Cataño, Dorado, Guaynabo, Toa Alta, Toa Baja and Trujillo Alto.

The mother church of the archidiocese is the Metropolitan Cathedral of San Juan Bautista in San Juan, officially named Cathedral Basilica of Saint John the Baptist and Parish of Our Lady of Remedies.

== Municipality of San Juan ==
Church name	Image	Location	Date est.	Description/notes
Asunción de la Santísma Virgen		El Cinco	1929	
Corpus Christi		Sabana Llana Sur	1967	
Cristo Redentor		El Cinco	1971	
Cristo Rey		Oriente		
Inmaculado Corazón de María		Monacillo Urbano		
Jesús Maestro		Monacillo	1969	
Jesús Mediador		Sabana Llana Norte	1984	
María Auxiliadora		Santurce		Salesian parish.
María Madre de la Iglesia		El Cinco		
Nuestra Señora de Guadalupe		Gobernador Piñero	1951	Colegio Nuestra Señora de Guadalupe is its parochial school.
Nuestra Señora de la Altagracia		Sabana Llana Norte		
Nuestra Señora de la Caridad del Cobre		Hato Rey Central		
Nuestra Señora de La Esperanza		Santurce		
Nuestra Señora de La Monserrate		Santurce		
Nuestra Señora de la Providencia		Cupey	1960	
Nuestra Señora de la Providencia		Santurce		
Nuestra Señora de Lourdes		Santurce	1959	Originally built as a Methodist Episcopal church in 1908 by Antonin Nechodoma. It operates as a Roman Catholic church since 1959.
Nuestra Señora del Carmen		Santurce	1944	
Nuestra Señora del Perpetuo Socorro		Santurce	1941	The church building dates to 1921, originally a small chapel. Academia del Perpetuo Socorro is its parochial school.
Nuestra Señora del Pilar		Río Piedras Pueblo	1714	Parish founded by the Franciscans. The current church was built in 1931 and was the main town church of the pueblo in the former municipality of Río Piedras before its merging into the San Juan municipality.
Resurrección del Señor		Gobernador Piñero		Franciscan parish.
Sagrada Familia		Sabana Llana Norte		
Sagrado Corazón de Jesús		Hato Rey Sur	1971	
Sagrado Corazón de Jesús		Santurce	1909	Formerly hosted a parochial school, now the Academia Interamericana Metro campus of the Interamerican University of Puerto Rico.
San Agustín		San Juan Antiguo	1915	Augustinian parish church and parochial school. The church was established in 1915 as the first bilingual Roman Catholic church in Puerto Rico.
San Antonio de Padua		Río Piedras Pueblo	1908	The current church dates to 1950. A community church has existed there since the 19th century.
San Francisco de Asís		San Juan Antiguo	1756	Originally built as a parish by the Third Order of Saint Francis. The first church was torn down due to earthquake and storm damage. The current church building dates to 1876.
San Francisco de Monte Alvernia		Sabana Llana Sur	1927	
San Francisco Javier		Cupey	1976	
San Ignacio de Loyola		Monacillo Urbano	1955	Parish church founded by Jesuits and designed by Henry Klumb. Colegio San Ignacio de Loyola is its parochial school.
San Jorge		Santurce	1920	Academia San Jorge is its parochial school.
San José		San Juan Antiguo	1528	One of the oldest church buildings in the Americas, it was established by the Dominican Order in 1528 as part of a monastery complex. After being abandoned for almost a century it was restored and re-consecrated in 2021.
San José Obrero		Oriente		
San Juan Bautista y Nuestra Señora de los Remedios		San Juan Antiguo	1521	Cathedral of the Archdiocese of San Juan and metropolitan see of the Ecclesiastical Province of San Juan. Established in 1521, this was the first colonial diocese to be established in the Americas and currently the second oldest purpose-built cathedral in the Western Hemisphere.
San Juan Bosco		Santurce	1953	
San Juan de la Cruz		Cupey	1994	
San Juan María Vianney "Santo Cura de Ars"		Caimito		
San Lucas Evangelista		Cupey		
San Luis Gonzaga		Sabana Llana Sur		
San Luis Rey		Gobernador Piñero	1965	
San Mateo		Santurce	1832	Oldest church in Santurce, first established as the main town church before Santurce was merged into the city of San Juan.
San Pablo Apóstol		Gobernador Piñero		
San Vicente de Paúl		Santurce	1938.	Established for the Congregation of the Mission.
Santa Ana		San Juan Antiguo	1775	
Santa Catalina Labouré		Caimito	1977	
Santa Cecilia		Cupey		
Santa Francisca Javier Cabrini (Madre Cabrini)		Gobernador Piñero	1952	
Santa Luisa de Marillac		Monacillo		
Santa María de los Ángeles		Gobernador Piñero		
Santa Rosa de Lima		Sabana Llana Sur		
Santa Teresa de Jornet		Cupey		
Santa Teresita del Niño Jesús		Santurce		
Santísimo Sacramento		Oriente		
Santísimo Salvador		Sabana Llana Sur	1965	The current parish church dates to 1976.
Santo Cristo de la Salud		San Juan Antiguo	1780	Votive chapel.
Santos Apóstoles Pedro y Pablo		Sabana Llana Norte		
Stella Maris		Santurce	1965	The current church was built on the location of a former neighborhood church.

== Municipality of Bayamón ==
Church name	Image	Location	Date est.	Description/notes
Ascensión del Señor		Pájaros		
Espíritu Santo		Buena Vista		
Invención de la Santa Cruz		Bayamón Pueblo	1750	Main town church of Bayamón, located in Plaza de Hostos.
La Milagrosa		Hato Tejas		
Nuestra Señora de La Monserrate		Santa Olaya	1985	The current church dates to 1988.
Nuestra Señora de los Dolores		Minillas		
Nuestra Señora del Perpetuo Socorro		Pájaros	1976	Dominican parish.
Nuestra Señora del Rosario		Juan Sánchez	1971	
Nuestra Señora del Rosario		Nuevo		
Resurrección del Señor		Cerro Gordo		
Sagrada Familia		Cerro Gordo		
San Agustín		Minillas	1964	
San Antonio María Claret		Pájaros	1971	
San José		Cerro Gordo	1964	
San Juan Bautista de La Salle		Hato Tejas	1962	Associated with Colegio De La Salle school.
San Miguel Arcángel		Juan Sánchez		
Santa Catalina de Siena		Pájaros	1963	Established by Trinitarians.
Santa Elena		Pájaros	1930	
Santa María		Buena Vista		
Santa Rita de Casia		Minillas		
Santa Teresa de Jesús		Hato Tejas	1983	
Santiago Apostol		Hato Tejas		It has a parochial school of the same name.
Santo Domingo de Guzmán		Buena Vista		
Santo Domingo de Guzmán		Hato Tejas		

== Municipality of Carolina ==
Church name	Image	Location	Date est.	Description/notes
Cristo Rey		Carruzos		
La Epifanía		Sabana Abajo	1968	
Nuestra Señora de Fátima		Cedro		
Nuestra Señora de la Inmaculada Concepción		Sabana Abajo		
Nuestra Señora de la Piedad		Cangrejo Arriba	2003	
Nuestra Señora del Carmen		Trujillo Bajo		
Nuestra Señora Reina de la Paz		Sabana Abajo		
Nuestra Señora Reina de los Ángeles		Cangrejo Arriba		
San Andrés		Sabana Abajo		
San Felipe Apóstol		Hoyo Mulas		
San Fernando de la Carolina		Carolina Pueblo	1862	Main town church of Carolina, located in Plaza Rey Fernando III.
San Francisco de Asís		Martín González		
San Juan de Dios		Hoyo Mulas		
San Valentín		Martín González		
Santa Clara de Asís		Sabana Abajo	1957	
Santa Gema Galgani Sanctuary		Sabana Abajo	1971	Served by the Passionist Order.
Santísima Trinidad		Sabana Abajo		
Santo Cristo de la Agonía		Sabana Abajo		
Santo Cristo de los Milagros		Hoyo Mulas		

== Municipality of Cataño ==
Church name	Image	Location	Date est.	Description/notes
Nuestra Señora del Carmen		Cataño Pueblo	1779	Main town church of Cataño, located across from the Plaza de Recreo de Cataño. The current parish church dates to 1893.
San Francisco de Sales		Palmas		
San Martín de Porres National Sanctuary		Palmas	1950	Henry Klumb-designed sanctuary and pilgrimage church built for the Dominican Priests.

== Municipality of Dorado ==
Church name	Image	Location	Date est.	Description/notes
Nuestra Señora de la Salud de los Enfermos		Higuillar		
San Antonio de Padua		Dorado Pueblo	1842	Main town church of Dorado, located across from its main town square. The current church building dates to 1848.

== Municipality of Guaynabo ==
Church name	Image	Location	Date est.	Description/notes
Buen Pastor		Frailes		
Corazón de Jesús		Sonadora		
Cristo Salvador		Frailes		
Divino Niño Jesús		Hato Nuevo	2000	A local church existed here between 1985 and 1990.
María Madre de la Misericordia		Frailes		
Nuestra Señora de Belén		Pueblo Viejo		With parochial School of Our Lady of Bethlehem.
Nuestra Señora de la Paz		Guaraguao	1973	
Sagrados Corazones		Frailes	1953	
San José		Pueblo Viejo	1947	The parish was formally established in 1948. Formerly had a parochial school Academia San José.
San Juan Evangelista		Frailes		San Juan Evangelista Preschool is an associated parochial school.
San Pedro Mártir de Verona		Guaynabo Pueblo	1750	Main town church of Guaynabo, located in its main town square. The parish was officially established in 1775 in order to provide religious services to the then rural town.
Santa Rosa de Lima		Pueblo Viejo		

== Municipality of Toa Alta ==
Church name	Image	Location	Date est.	Description/notes
Nuestra Señora de la Concepción y San Fernando		Toa Alta Pueblo	1752	Main town church of Toa Alta, located across from the main town square.
Nuestra Señora de la Medalla Milagrosa		Quebrada Cruz		
Nuestra Señora Madre de la Divina Providencia		Mucarabones		
San Esteban Protomártir		Mucarabones		
San José		Río Lajas		
San Judas Tadeo		Galateo		

== Municipality of Toa Baja ==
Church name	Image	Location	Date est.	Description/notes
Apóstoles San Pedro y San Matías		Toa Baja Pueblo	1750	Main town church of Toa Baja, located in Plaza Virgilio Dávila. Built in stages between 1750 and 1790. It has the distinction of being the only main town church in Puerto Rico with a main entrance that faces away from the main town square.
Espíritu Santo		Sabana Seca	1965	Built as part of the Levittown urban development.
Nuestra Señora de la Covadonga		Candelaria		
Nuestra Señora de la Candelaria		Candelaria		
Nuestra Señora del Carmen		Palo Seco	1840	Main church of the former municipality of Trinidad de Palo Seco, today a barrio of Toa Baja. The historic structure survives to this day, today a small local chapel.
San José Obrero		Sabana Seca	1994	Served by the Franciscans.
Santísima Trinidad		Sabana Seca		

== Municipality of Trujillo Alto ==
Church name	Image	Location	Date est.	Description/notes
Exaltación de la Santa Cruz		Trujillo Alto Pueblo	1817	Main town church of Trujillo Alto, located in its main town square. The first church was destroyed by Hurricane San Felipe, the current building dates to 1928.
María Llena de Gracia		Cuevas		
Nuestra Señora de Lourdes (Gruta de Lourdes)		Cuevas	1925	Popular pilgrimage site dedicated to Our Lady of Lourdes established at a site of natural springs. The current parish dates to 1975. The original hermitage now serves as a chapel for smaller services.
San Bartolomé		Cuevas		
San Francisco de Asís		Quebrada Negrito		
San Judas Tadeo		Carraízo		
San Pío X		St. Just	1953	
