= Inventory of Historic Churches of Puerto Rico =

- Historic Churches of Puerto Rico
- U.S. National Register of Historic Places
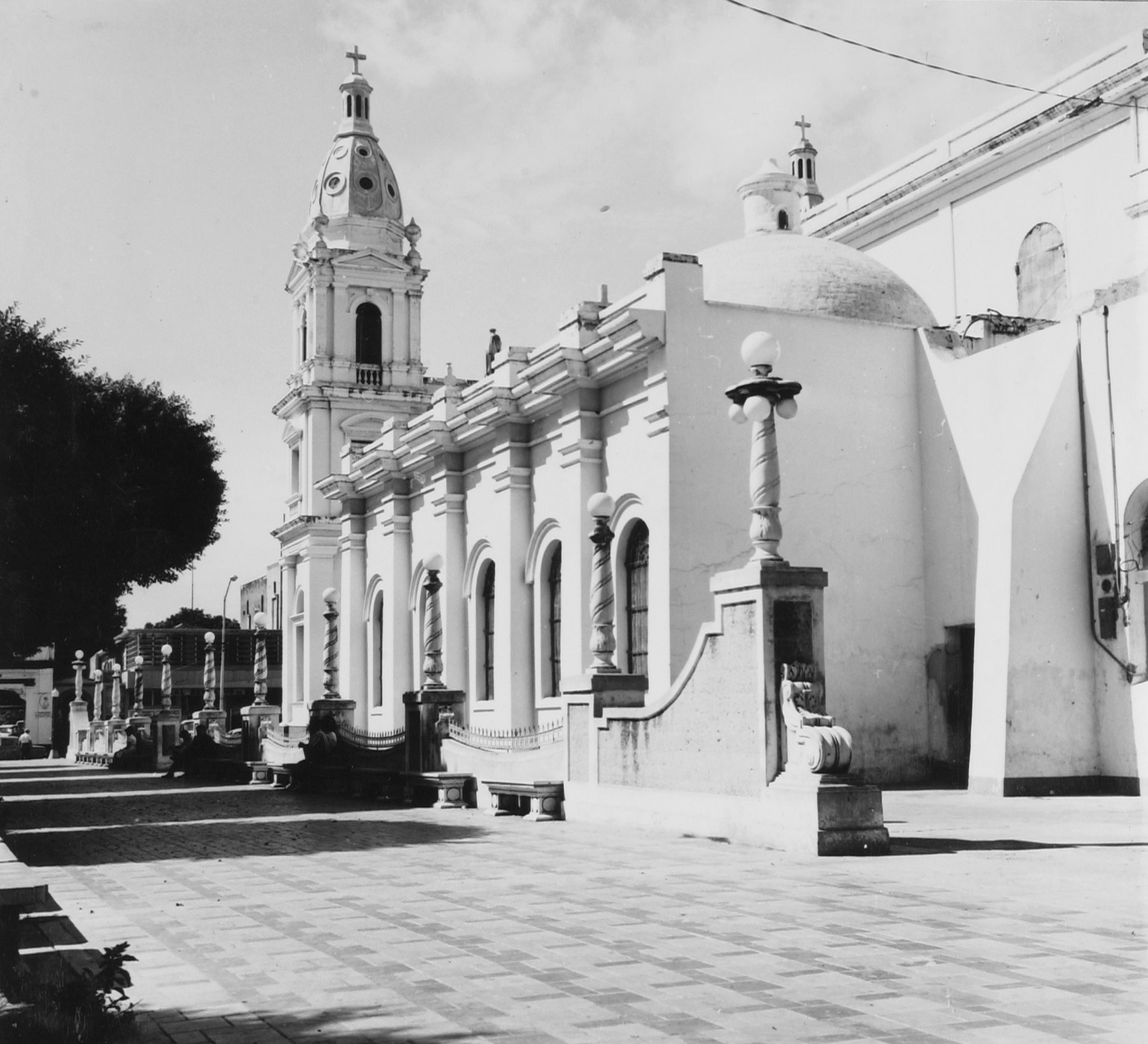
- Ponce Cathedral in 1964
- Location: Puerto Rico
- Architectural style: Church architecture
- MPS: MPL8400 – Historic Churches of Puerto Rico Thematic Nomination
- NRHP reference No.: 64000741
- Added to NRHP: December 10, 1984

The Inventory of Historic Churches of Puerto Rico (Spanish: Inventario de Iglesias Históricas de Puerto Rico) is a thematic historic register of Roman Catholic church buildings in Puerto Rico curated by both the Puerto Rico Planning Board's (Junta de Planificación) Register of Historic Sites and Zones (RNSZH) and the United States National Park Service's National Register of Historic Places (NRHP), submitted to the latter as a thematic multiple property submission (MPS) and approved on December 10, 1984. These churches were chosen for being exemplary of the Spanish Colonial urban planning practices of the 18th and 19th centuries as it was legally stipulated by the Law of the Indies.

== Inventory-listed churches ==
All the churches on the inventory were also added to the Puerto Rico Register of Historic Sites and Zones. Out of the 31 churches listed on the inventory, the submission of 24 were approved and listed on the federal National Register of Historic Places.

Church name	Image	Location	Built	Architect	NRHP Ref.
San Carlos Borromeo		Aguadilla	1783	José Canovas	84003124
San José		Aibonito	1887	Pedro Cobreros	84000451
San Felipe Apóstol		Arecibo	1846	not stated	not listed
Santa Cruz		Bayamón	1772	José Martínez de Matos	84003162
San Fernando		Carolina	1860	Antonio Maria de Vizcarrando, Lorenzo Mongrand	84003160
Nuestra Señora de la Asunción		Cayey	1815	José Canovas	84000454
San Blas de Illescas		Coamo	1661	not stated	84000463
Our Lady of Valvanera		Coamo	1685	not stated	86000700
San Antonio de Padua		Dorado	1848	not stated	not listed
Santiago Apóstol		Fajardo	1776	Pedro A. Beibal	84003144
Inmaculada Concepción		Guayanilla	1838	not stated	not listed
San José		Gurabo	1821	not stated	84003142
Nuestra Señora del Carmen		Hatillo	1879	Pedro A. Beibal	84000443
Dulce Nombre de Jesús		Humacao	1869	Evaristo de Churruca	84003140
San Ramón Nonato		Juana Díaz	1807	not stated	84000465
Inmaculada Concepción		Juncos	1827	not stated	not listed
San José		Lares	1881	Ramón Soler (reconstruction)	not listed
Nuestra Señora de la Candelaria		Manatí	1864	Ramón Soler (reconstruction)	84003130
Nuestra Señora de la Candelaria		Mayagüez	1763	Luis Perocier	not listed
San Juan Bautista		Maricao	1890	Jeronimo Jiminez Coranado	84003125
Nuestra Señora de la Monserrate		Moca	1841	not stated	not listed
Nuestra Señora del Rosario		Naguabo	1856	Mariano Bosch (reconstruction)	84000456
Nuestra Señora de Guadalupe		Ponce	1839	Francisco Porrata-Doría (reconstruction)	84000467
San Isidro Labrador		Sabana Grande	1844	not stated	84000460
San Germán de Auxerre		San Germán	1688	Jean Puig	84000461
San Sebastián Mártir		San Sebastián	1895	Pedro Cobreros	84003132
San Mateo de Cangrejos		San Juan	1832	Pedro Cobreros	85000044
San Fernando		Toa Alta	1752	not stated	84003158
San Miguel Arcángel		Utuado	1872	not stated	84000447
Inmaculada Concepción		Vega Alta	1831	Jose Hernandez Costa	84003128
Santa María del Rosario		Vega Baja	1860	Antonio María Guitián	84003133

== Other historic churches ==
Other historic Roman Catholic churches that also follow the relevant Law of the Indies parameters and have also been included in the National Register of Historic Places (NRHP) and/or the Puerto Rico Register of Historic Sites and Zones (RNSZH) albeit not under this multiple property submission include:

- Church of Our Lady of Mount Carmel (Iglesia de Nuestra Señora del Carmen), the town parish of Arroyo built in 1855 and listed as a contributing property of the Arroyo Historic Zone on the RNSZH in 1997.
- Cathedral of the Sweet Name of Jesus (Catedral Dulce Nombre de Jesús), the cathedral of Caguas built in 1645 and listed as a contributing property of the Caguas Historic Zone on the RNSZH in 1996.
- San Antonio de Padua Church (Iglesia de San Antonio de Padua), the town parish of Guayama built in 1874, inscribed on the NRHP in 1976 and, as part of the Guayama Historic Zone, on the RNSZH in 1992.
- San Pedro Mártir Church (Iglesia de San Pedro Mártir), the town parish of Guaynabo built in 1750, and listed on the NRHP since 1976 and on the RNSZH since 2000.
- Basilica of the Our Lady of Monserrat (Basilica de Nuestra Señora del Monserrate), the town parish church of Hormigueros built in the 19th-century, a Marian shrine since 1994 and a minor basilica since 1998, inscribed on the NRHP in 1975, and on the RNSZH in 2000.
- Church of the Holy Spirit and Saint Patrick (Iglesia del Espíritu Santo y San Patricio), the town parish church of Loíza built in 1729, and listed on the NRHP in 1976 and on the RNSZ since 2000.
- Church of Our Lady of the Rosary (Iglesia de Nuestra Señora del Rosario), the town parish of Naguabo built in 1856, and listed on the NRHP in 1984, and on the RNSZ since 2003.
- Metropolitan Cathedral Basilica of Saint John the Baptist (Catedral Basílica Metropolitana de San Juan Bautista), the cathedral of San Juan, the first purpose-built cathedral in the Americas, technically built in 1535 before the establishment of the Law of the Indies (1573) and therefore not located in the main town square (Plaza de Armas) of the city. Listed as a contributing property of the Old San Juan National Historic Landmark District on the NRHP since 1972, and on the RNSZH since 2000.
- Las Mercedes Church (Iglesia de Nuestra Señora de las Mercedes), the town parish of San Lorenzo built in 1887, and listed on the NRHP since 1983, and on the RNSZ since 2000.
- San Pedro Apostol Church (Iglesia de San Pedro Apostol), the town parish of Toa Baja built in 1750, and listed on the NRHP since 1975, and on the RNSZH since 2000.
- Church of the Holy Rosary (Iglesia del Santísimo Rosario), the town parish of Yauco built in 1930 on the site of the former parish built in 1849, and listed as a contributing property of the Yauco Historic Zone on the RNSZH in 2022.

== See also ==
- History of urban planning
- Law of the Indies
- Pueblos in Puerto Rico
