= Church Nuestra Señora del Rosario of Naguabo =

Roman Catholic church in Puerto Rico

- Church Nuestra Senora del Rosario of Naguabo
- U.S. National Register of Historic Places
- Puerto Rico Historic Sites and Zones
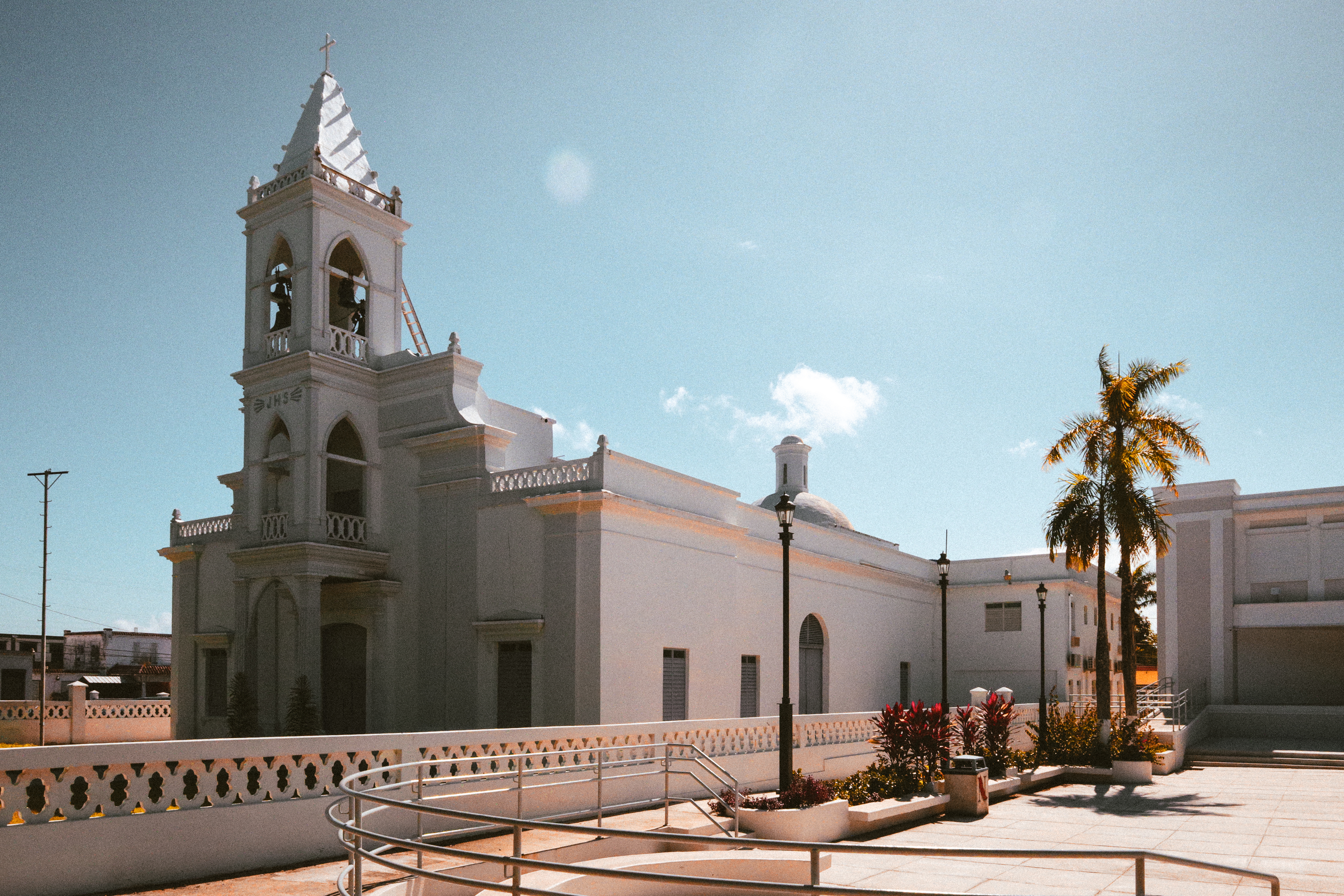

- Location within Puerto Rico
- Location: Main town square (plaza pública) of Naguabo, Puerto Rico
- Coordinates: 18°12′43″N 65°44′08″W
- Built: 1856
- Architectural style: Spanish Colonial
- NRHP reference No.: 84000456
- RNSZH No.: 2000-(RE)-18-JP-SH

Significant dates
- Added to NRHP: December 10, 1984
- Designated RNSZH: May 16, 2001

The Church Nuestra Señora del Rosario of Naguabo (Spanish: Iglesia de Nuestra Señora del Rosario de Naguabo) is a historic 19th-century Roman Catholic parish church located in Naguabo Pueblo, the administrative and historic center of the municipality of Naguabo, Puerto Rico.

The church was built in 1856 with additional modifications being made by engineer Mariano Bosch in 1858, and its original timber and wooden roof being replaced between 1913 and 1921. The church is one of the oldest structures in Naguabo. It is listed in both the Inventory of Historic Churches of Puerto Rico and the National Register of Historic Places since 1984, and was added to the Puerto Rico Register of Historic Sites and Zones in 2003.

== Gallery ==
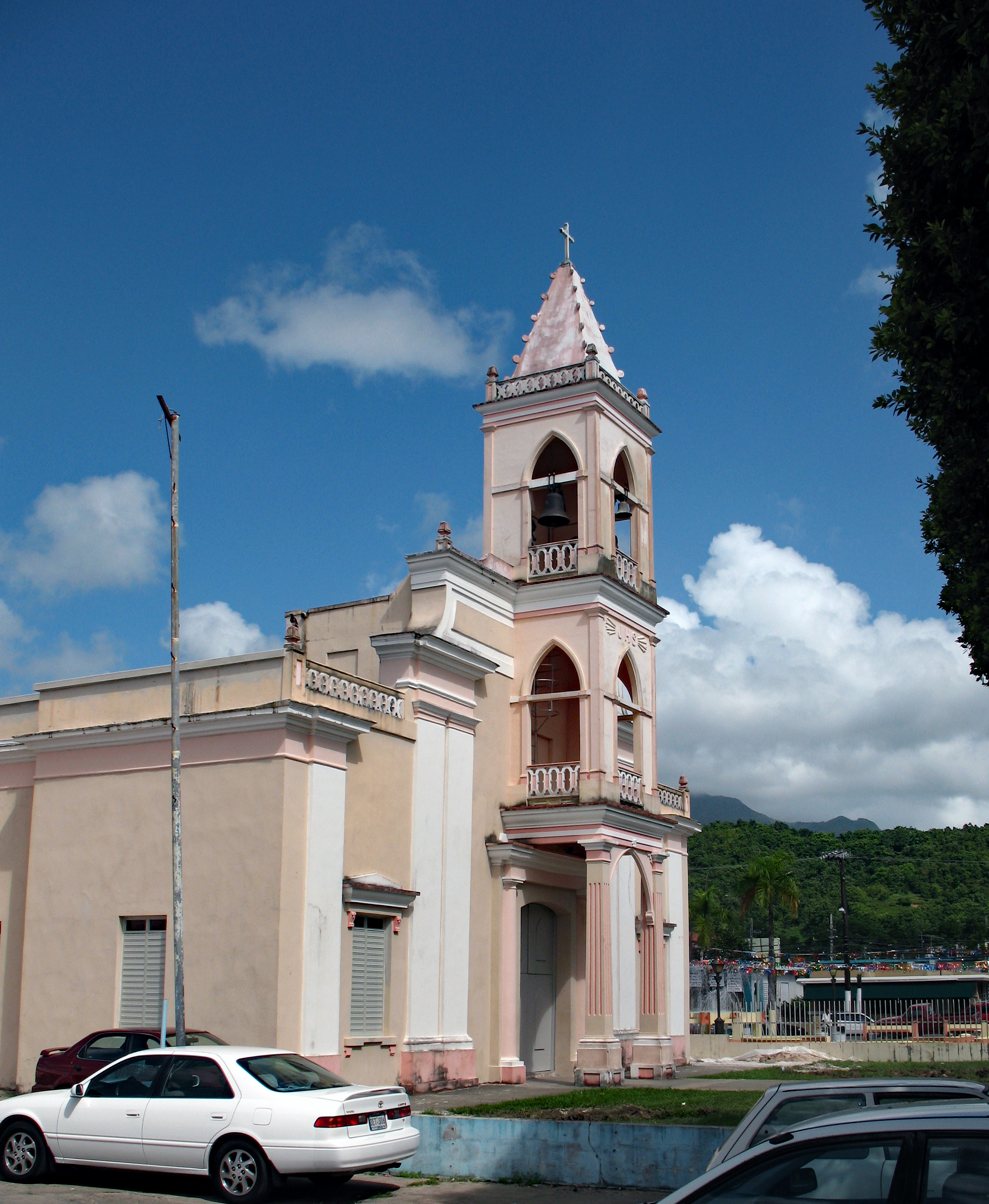
The church in 2022 with Pico del Este in the background.

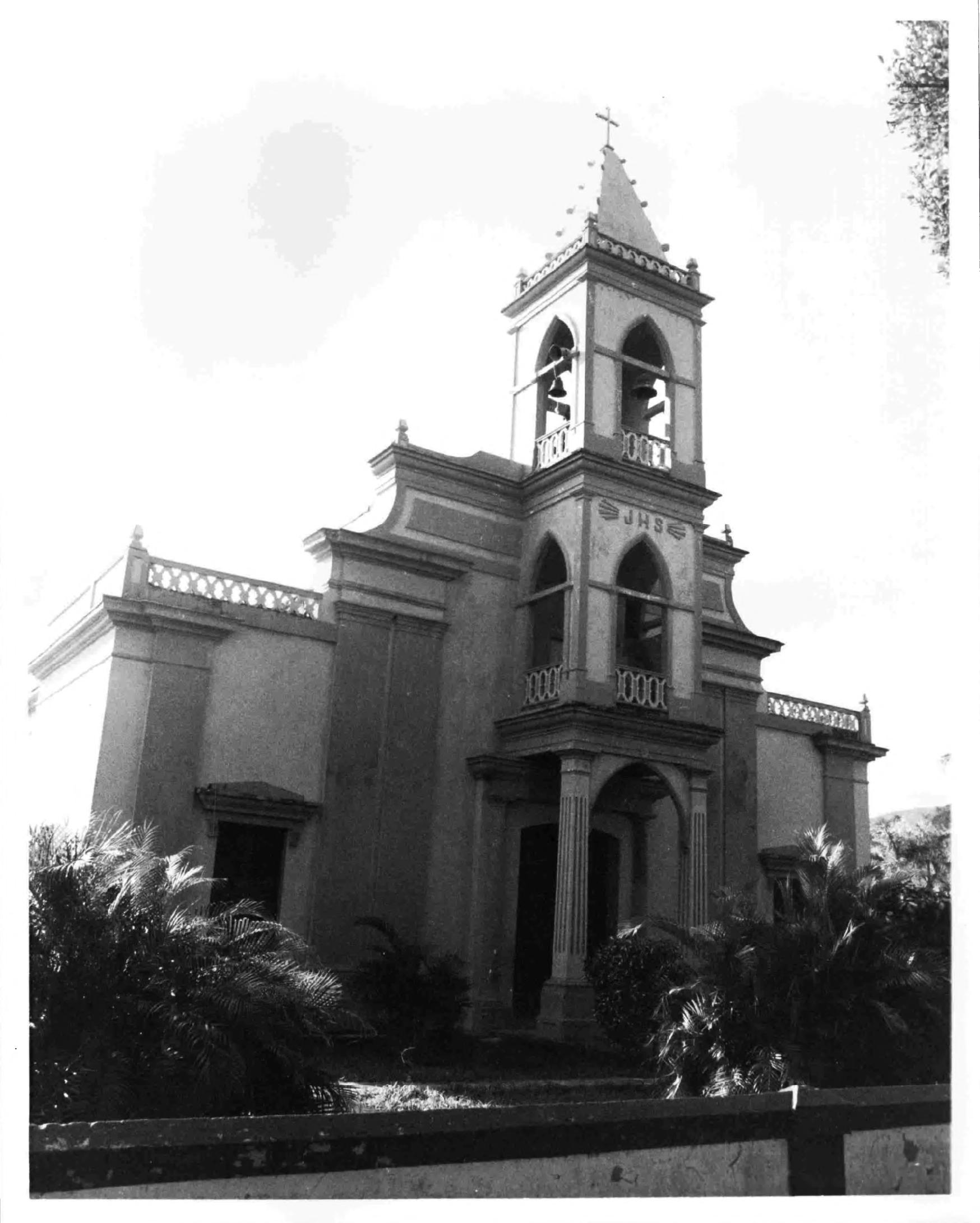
The church in 1984.

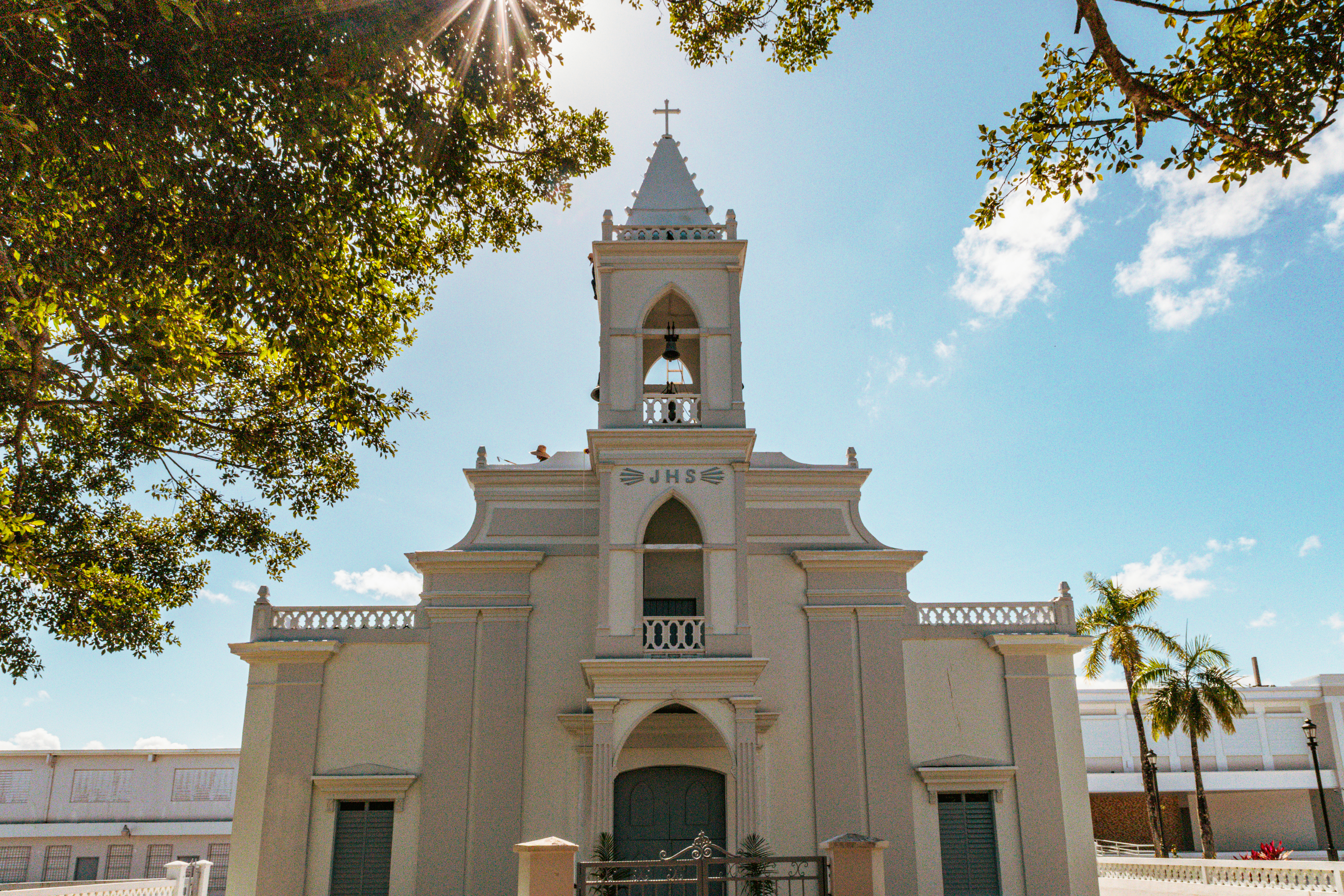
Front façade in 2025

== See also ==
- National Register of Historic Places listings in eastern Puerto Rico
