= Nuestra Señora del Rosario Church =

Church of Our Lady of the Rosary
- Iglesia Nuestra Señora del Rosario
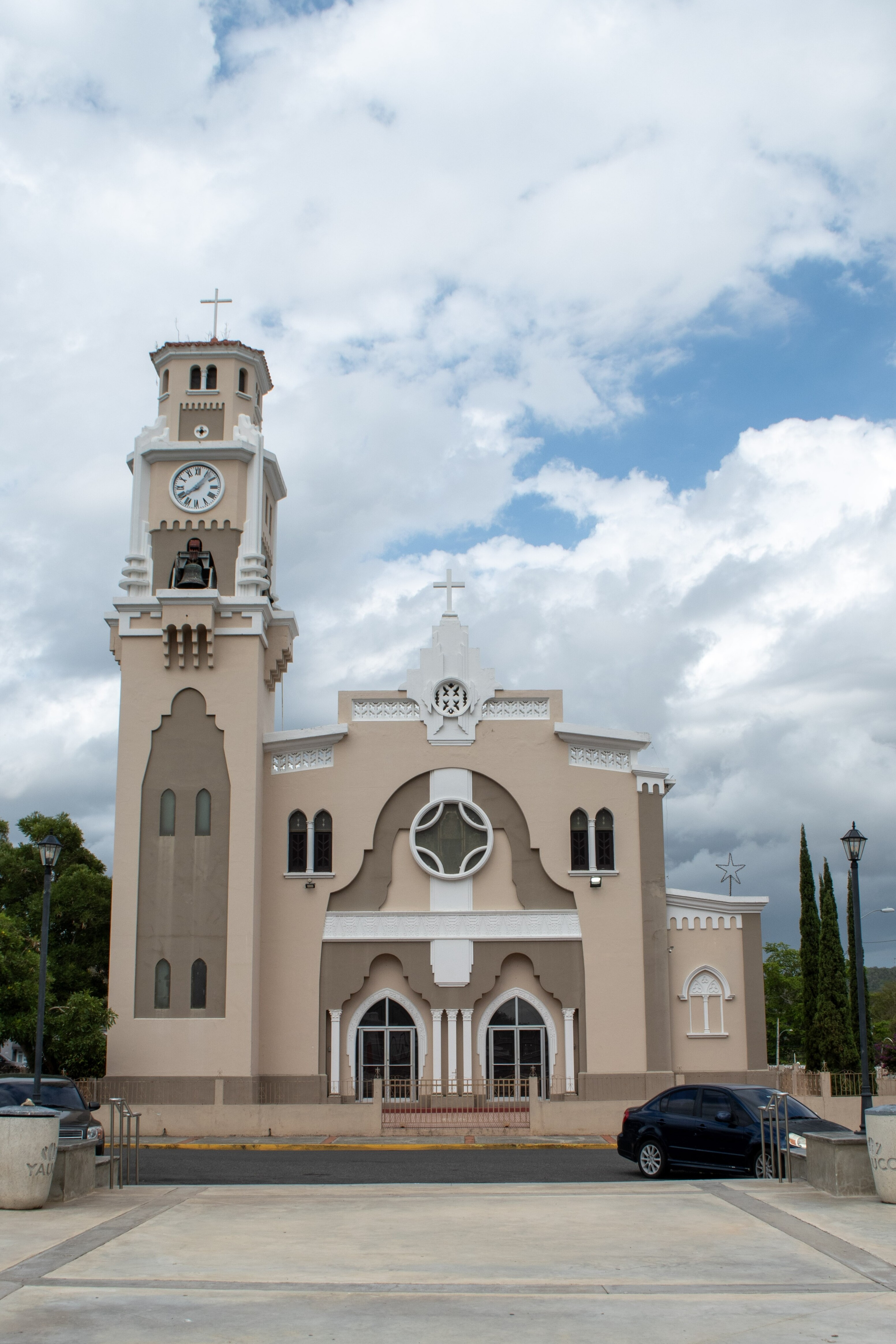
- Front facade of the Nuestra Señora del Rosario Church
- Church of Our Lady of the Rosary
- 18.0353°N 66.8483°W
- Location: Plaza Fernando Pacheco; Yauco, Puerto Rico
- Country: Puerto Rico
- Denomination: Roman Catholic Church

History
- Status: Parish church
- Founded: 1754
- Founder: Spanish settlers of Yauco
- Dedication: Our Lady of the Rosary
- Dedicated: 1934

Architecture
- Architect: Francisco Porrata Doria
- Style: Gothic Revival; Mozarabic influences
- Groundbreaking: 1931
- Completed: April 8 1934

Specifications
- Materials: Masonry

Administration
- Archdiocese: San Juan
- Diocese: Ponce

The Church of Our Lady of the Rosary (Iglesia Nuestra Señora del Rosario) is a Roman Catholic parish church located in downtown Yauco, Puerto Rico. It sits on the western side of the town's central square, Plaza Fernando Pacheco, directly across from Yauco City Hall. The church is dedicated to Our Lady of the Rosary, the patron saint of Yauco, and falls under the Diocese of Ponce. The present structure, the third to occupy the site, was built between 1931 and 1934 and was designed by Ponce-born architect Francisco Porrata Doria. The church is a contributing property of the Yauco Historic Zone, listed on the Puerto Rico Register of Historic Sites and Zones (RNSZH) since 2022.

== History ==
=== Original hermitage and relocation (c. 1750s) ===
Before the present town center was established, an earlier hermitage dedicated to Our Lady of the Holy Rosary stood at the site of Yauco's original Spanish settlement, located south of the current town along what is today PR-335. This structure, which predates the formal founding of Yauco, was abandoned in the 1750s when the growing settler community relocated northward to a more favorable inland site—the location of the present-day town center. The ruins of this original hermitage survive today and are preserved by the municipality as the Parque de la Fundación (Founding Park), serving as a museum and open-air historical site at the entrance to Yauco Pueblo. The site is commonly referred to as the Nuestra Señora del Rosario Hermitage Ruins (Antigua Ermita de Yauco).

=== First church (1754–1848) ===
Following the relocation of the community northward, Spanish settlers of the Yauco region built a new small wooden hermitage at the new town center in 1754, again in honor of the Virgin of the Holy Rosary. The structure was named Nuestra Señora del Santísimo Rosario (Our Lady of the Most Holy Rosary). It measured approximately 87 feet (27 m) long by 39 feet (12 m) wide, with a roof covered in clay tiles.

The construction of this chapel fulfilled one of the legal requirements—established by Spain's Law of the Indies—for the creation of a new municipality: the existence of a place of worship. The settlers sent Fernando Pacheco as their representative to the Spanish Crown to petition for the establishment of a municipality. On February 29, 1756, the King of Spain granted the settlers their request, and the town of Yauco was officially founded, with Fernando Pacheco named its first Lieutenant of War.

By 1848, the original wooden hermitage had fallen into severe disrepair and had become too small to accommodate the growing population. It was subsequently demolished.

=== Second church (1849–1931) ===
Between 1849 and the mid-19th century, a second and larger church was constructed on the same site, this time built of masonry. The new structure measured approximately 99 feet (30 m) long by 69 feet (21 m) wide. In 1880, further improvements were made, including the construction of a clock turret on the facade. This second church was demolished in 1931 to make way for the current structure.

=== Current church (1931–present) ===
The current church was built between 1931 and 1934 to plans drawn by architect Francisco Porrata Doria, a native of Ponce who also designed the current facade of the Cathedral of Our Lady of Guadalupe in Ponce during the same period. The present building measures approximately 120 feet (37 m) long by 50 feet (15 m) wide.

The Register of Historic Sites and Zones (RNSZH) recognized the church as a contributing property of the Yauco Historic Zone in 2022.

== Architecture ==
=== Exterior ===
The facade of the church exhibits notable Mozarabic and Gothic influences, including tall pointed arches characteristic of both Moorish architecture and later European Gothic design. A single prominent bell tower dominates the front facade, decorated with ornamental details and pointed-arch windows. The overall composition gives the building a striking vertical presence on Plaza Fernando Pacheco, particularly when illuminated at night.

=== Interior ===
The interior of the church follows a nave-and-aisle plan. The central nave is separated from the side aisles by a series of eight-sided arcades, modest in ornamentation. The roof above the nave is slightly vaulted, with arches echoing those of the arcades. Along the side walls, lancet-arched windows admit natural light into the interior. The exposed ceiling beams of the central nave appear to be made of wood but are in fact constructed of steel and clad in wood. The original Criollo tile floor has been preserved in excellent condition.

== Religious significance ==
The church is dedicated to Our Lady of the Rosary, the patron saint of the municipality of Yauco. Each October, the town celebrates the Fiestas Patronales de Nuestra Virgen del Rosario, a religious and cultural festival that typically features parades, traditional food, artisan crafts, amusement rides, and live entertainment.

On the liturgical feast of Our Lady of the Rosary (October 7), special masses are celebrated at the church, drawing devotees from across the municipality and surrounding region.

== Location ==
The church is located at 24 Calle Mattei Lluveras, facing Plaza Fernando Pacheco in the historic downtown (el pueblo) of Yauco. Yauco City Hall stands directly across the plaza. The church and plaza are part of the Yauco Historic Zone, which preserves the Spanish colonial character of the town center.

== Hermitage ruins ==
The ruins of the original pre-town hermitage are preserved at the entrance to Yauco Pueblo along PR-335, near the site of Yauco's first Spanish settlement. Known today as the Nuestra Señora del Rosario Hermitage Ruins or Antigua Ermita de Yauco, the site is maintained by the municipality as the Parque de la Fundación and is open to the public free of charge. The ruins stand as a physical testament to the religious origins of Yauco and its founding community, predating the present church by nearly two centuries.

== See also ==
- Catedral de Nuestra Señora de Guadalupe
- Inventory of Historic Churches of Puerto Rico
- Diocese of Ponce
- Yauco, Puerto Rico
