= Church, School, Convent and Parish House of San Agustín =

- Church, School, Convent and Parish House of San Agustin
- U.S. National Register of Historic Places
- U.S. Historic district – Contributing property
- Puerto Rico Historic Sites and Zones
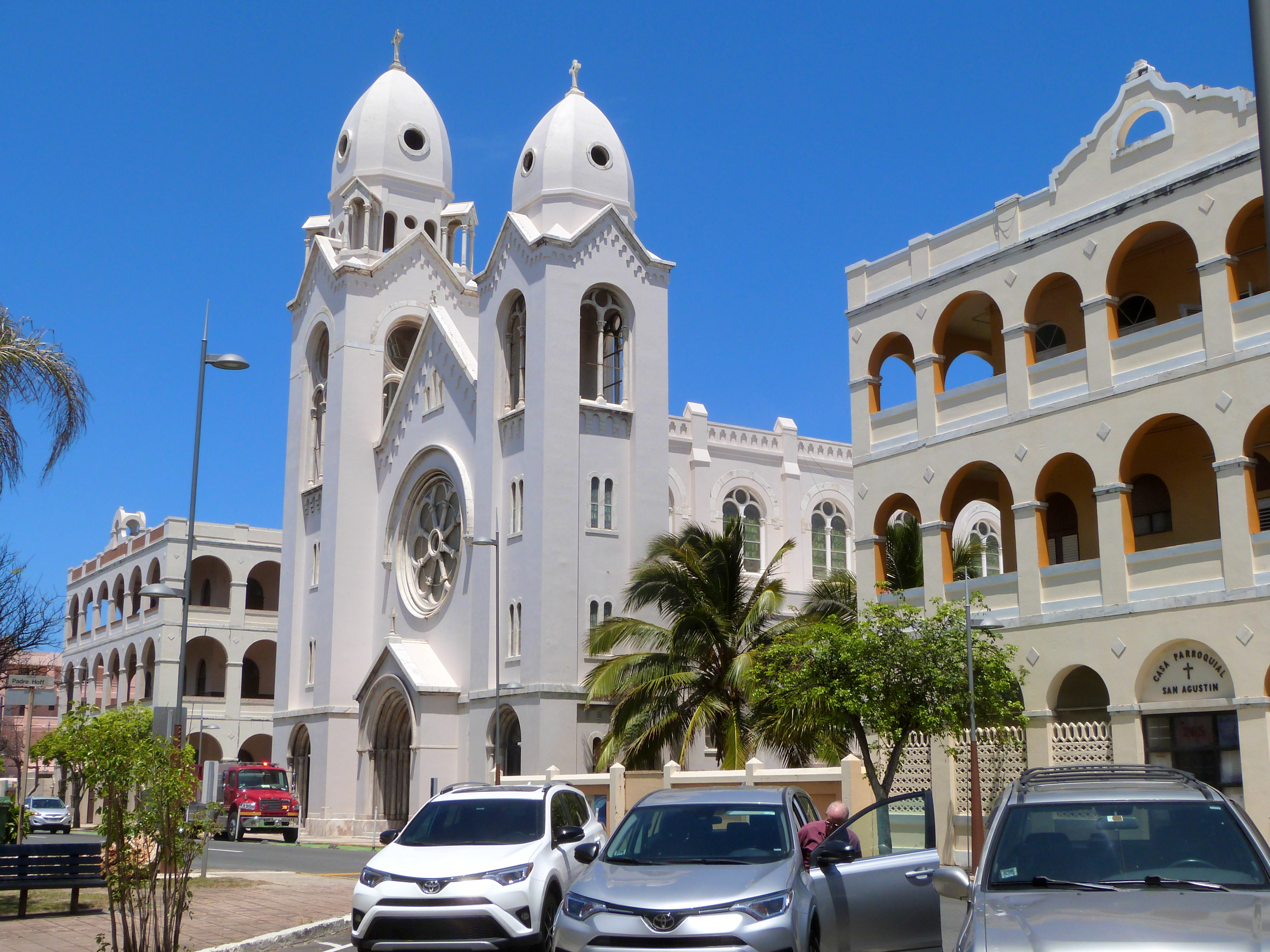
- Church, parish house and school building in 2017.

- Location within Puerto Rico
- Location: 265 Ponce de León Ave. San Juan, Puerto Rico
- Coordinates: 18.4656953°N 66.0986962°W
- Built: 1915
- Part of: Puerta de Tierra Historic District (ID100002936)
- NRHP reference No.: 85003194
- RNSZH No.: 2000-(RMSJ)-00-JP-SH

Significant dates
- Added to NRHP: December 30, 1985
- Designated CP: October 15, 2019
- Designated RNSZH: February 3, 2000

The Church, School, Convent and Parish House of San Agustín is a National Register of Historic Places (NRHP)-listed historic religious complex located in the Puerta de Tierra historic district of San Juan Antiguo in the city of San Juan, Puerto Rico. The complex consists of the Church of St. Augustine (Spanish: Iglesia de San Agustín), its adjacent Augustinian convent (also housing the Catholic school) and the parish house. The church itself was one of the first structures to be built using only concrete in the island and for this reason it is also listed in the Inventory of Historic Churches of Puerto Rico in 1990 in addition to being listed in the NRHP since 1985. The church complex is a contributing property, and, along the Capitol of Puerto Rico, it forms part of the monumental sequence of buildings, memorials and parks along the Ponce de León Avenue that constitute the Puerta de Tierra Historic District.

== History ==
The site where the complex would be built had been designated for a parish church since 1867 at a place locally known as the San Cristóbal field (Campo de San Cristóbal). A small chapel was built there in 1886 after the then president of the Catholic Association of San Juan, Ramón Risco, officially petitioned the edification of a church to serve the 2,500 Roman Catholic residents of the area. Before the establishment of the parish, this chapel was first under the directory of the Saint Francis of Assisi parish church in Old San Juan. Puerta de Tierra at the time was experiencing a population boom from the expanding Old San Juan to the west after the southeastern portion of the city wall was demolished at the end of the 19th-century to make way for the urban sprawl of the city.

The parish church was founded prior to their construction by the Congregation of the Most Holy Redeemer, better known as the Redemptorist Order, in 1911 by Father John Lynch with the support of Guillermo Jones, then Bishop of San Juan. By the time there were already 11 monks and 11 nuns living and working in the local Redemptorist Order. The architectural style of the church was partially inspired in contemporary late 19th-century Old World churches such as the Basilica of Sacré-Coeur de Montmartre in Paris. The church was built between 1914 and 1915 and named San Agustín, after Augustine of Hippo who is traditionally considered the patron saint of the Puerta de Tierra neighborhood. The convent and school were officially founded on December 8, 1915. At the time, was the only church in the island that conducted daily services in English.

== Gallery ==
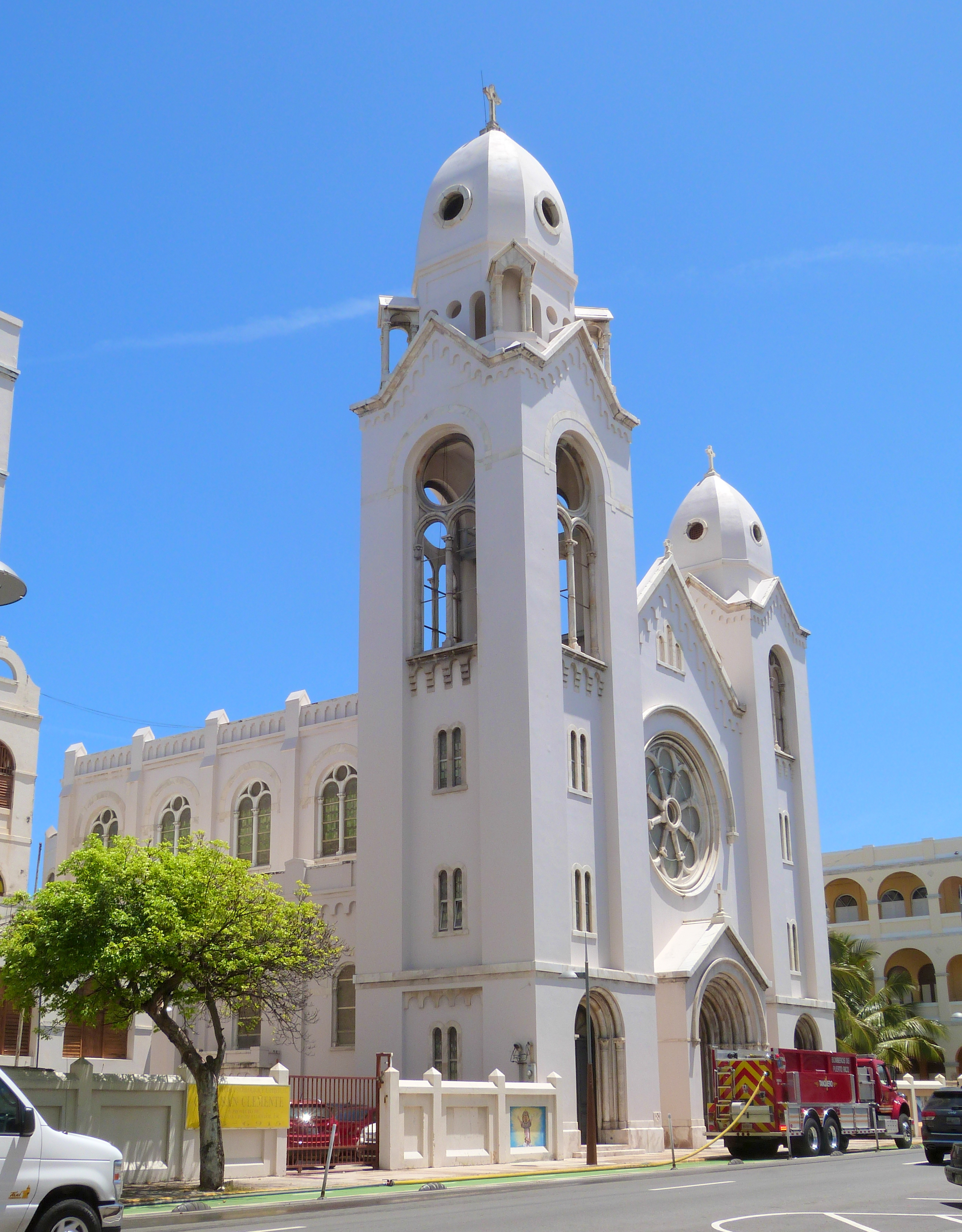
Church façade in 2017.

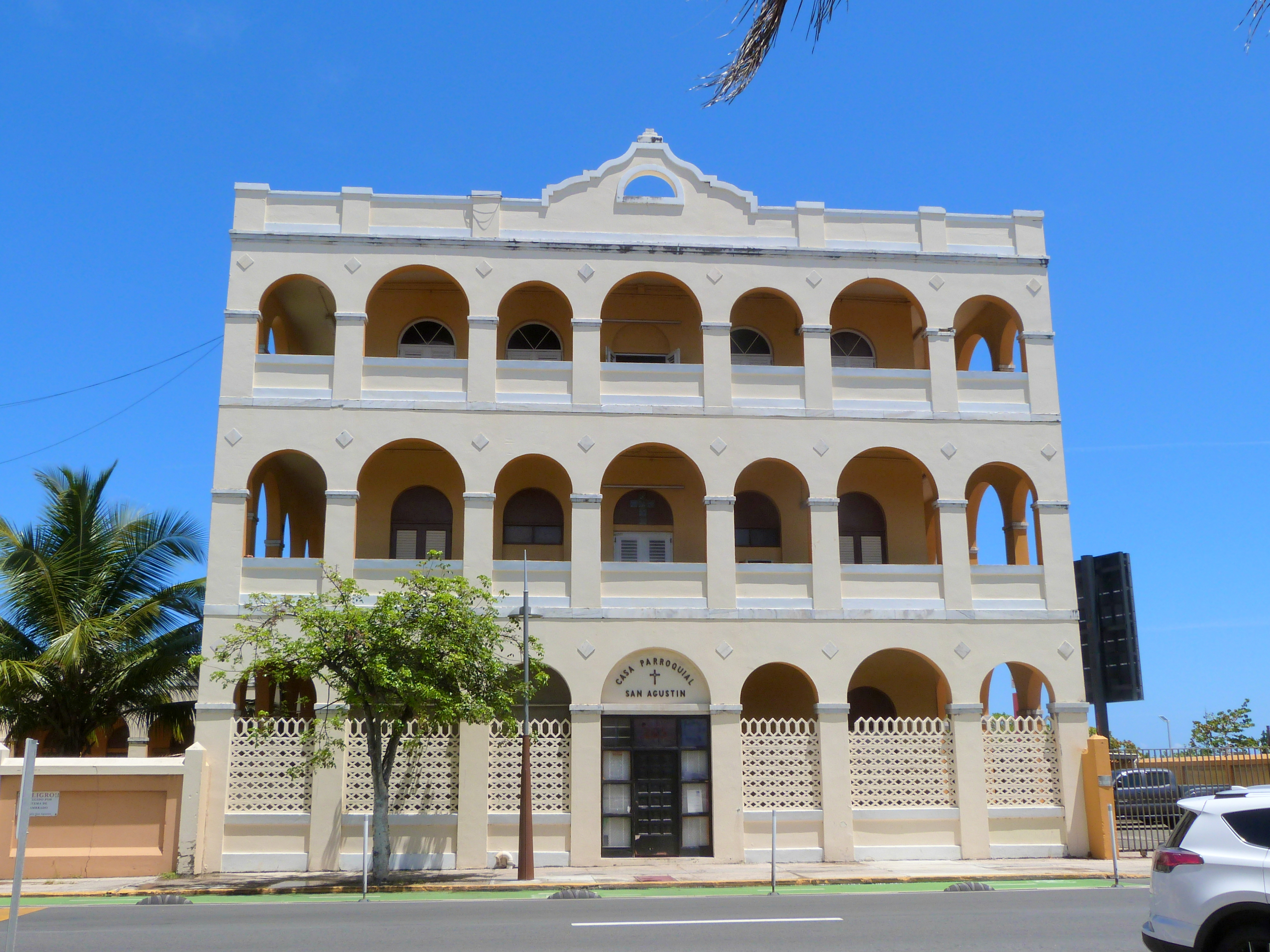
Parish church (casa parroquial) in 2017.

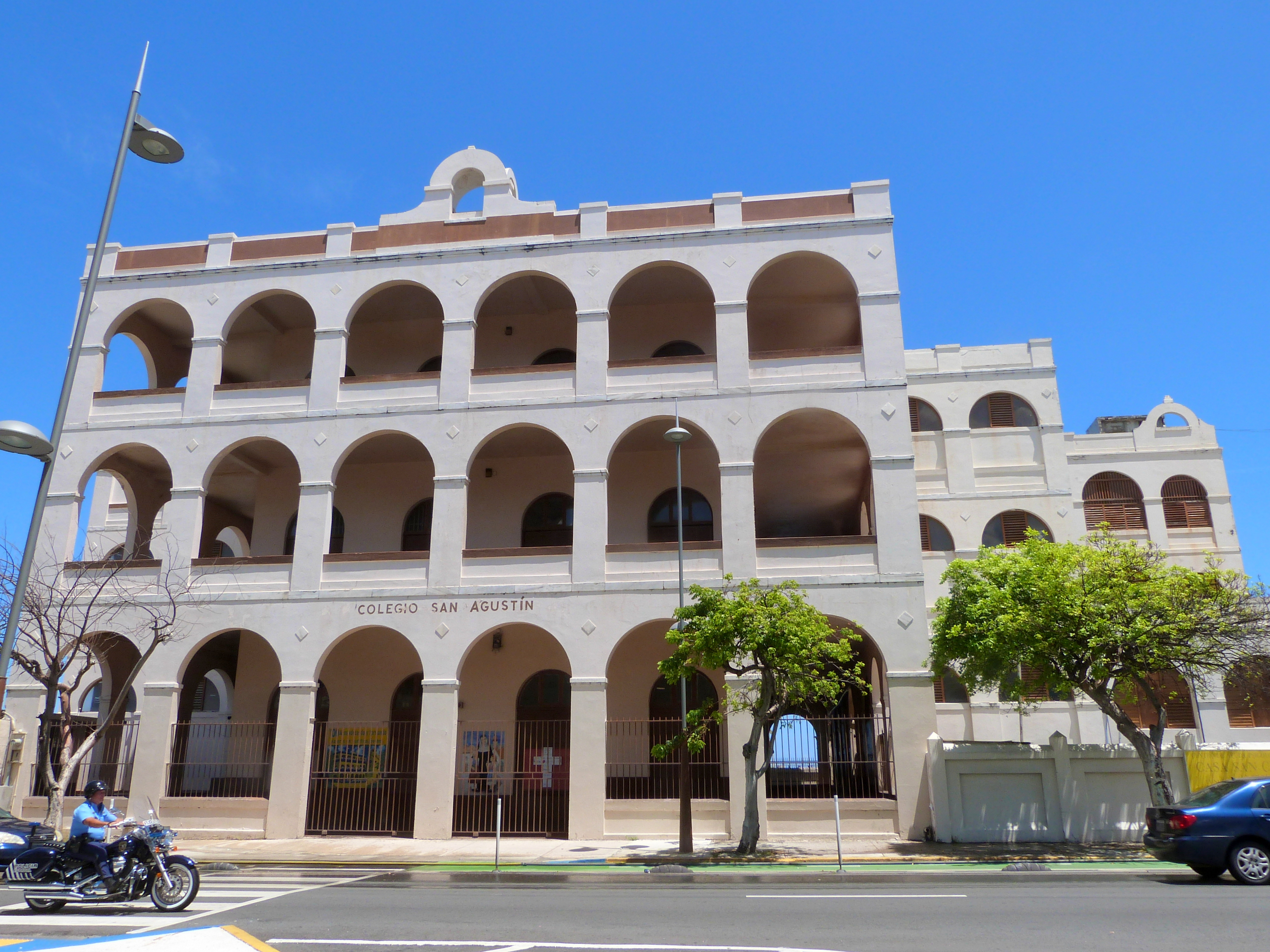
Convent and school building (Colegio San Agustín) in 2017.

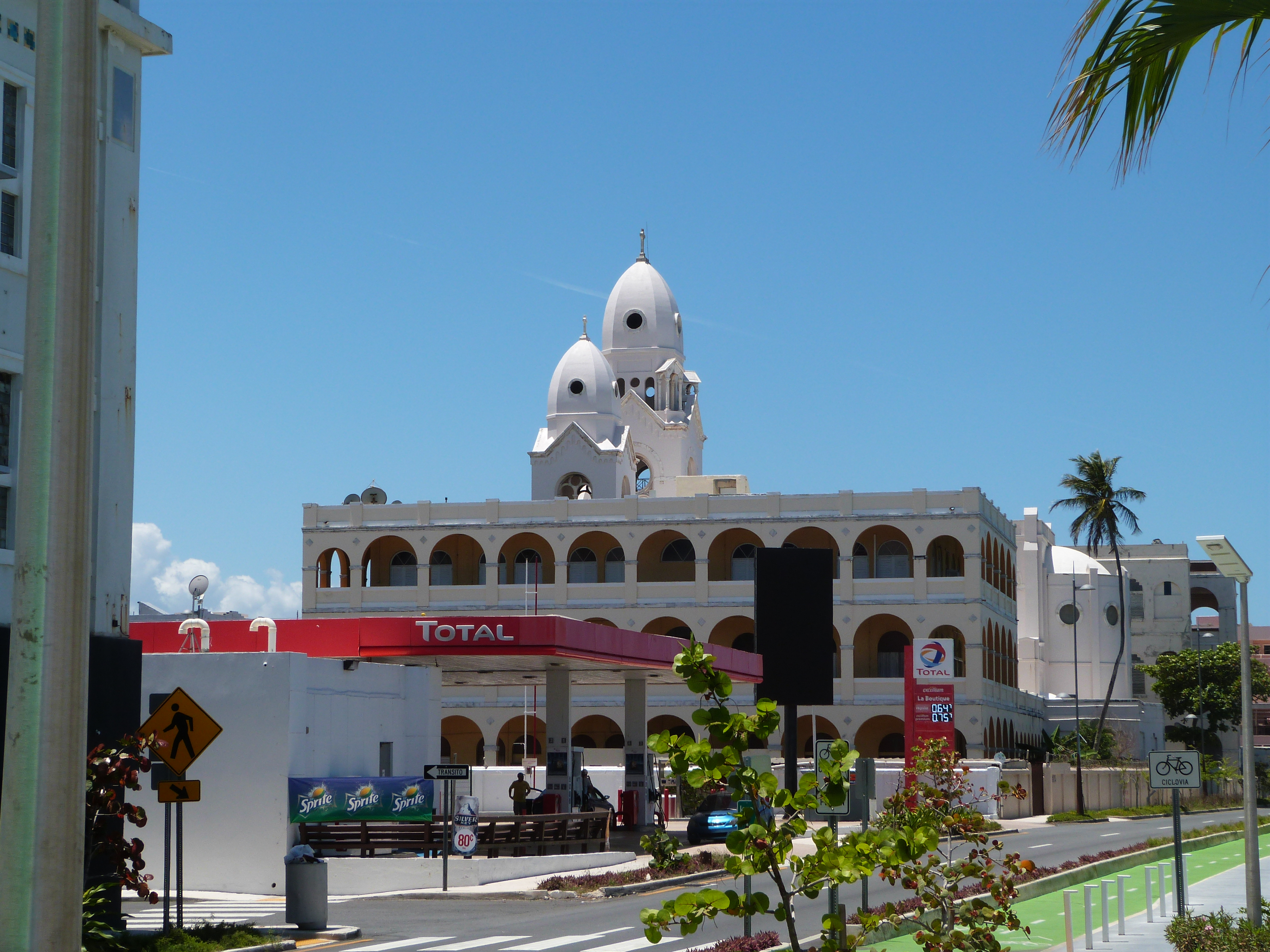
The San Agustín complex as seen from Luis Muñoz Rivera Ave in 2017.

== See also ==
- National Register of Historic Places listings in San Juan, Puerto Rico
