= Bayamón barrio-pueblo =

Historical and administrative center (seat) of Bayamón, Puerto Rico

Bayamón barrio-pueblo Pueblo de Bayamón
- Municipality Seat
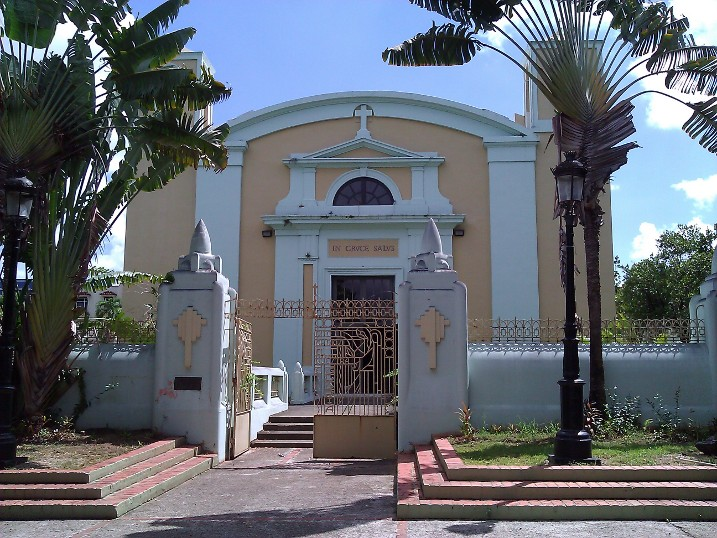
- Parroquia Invención de la Santa Cruz

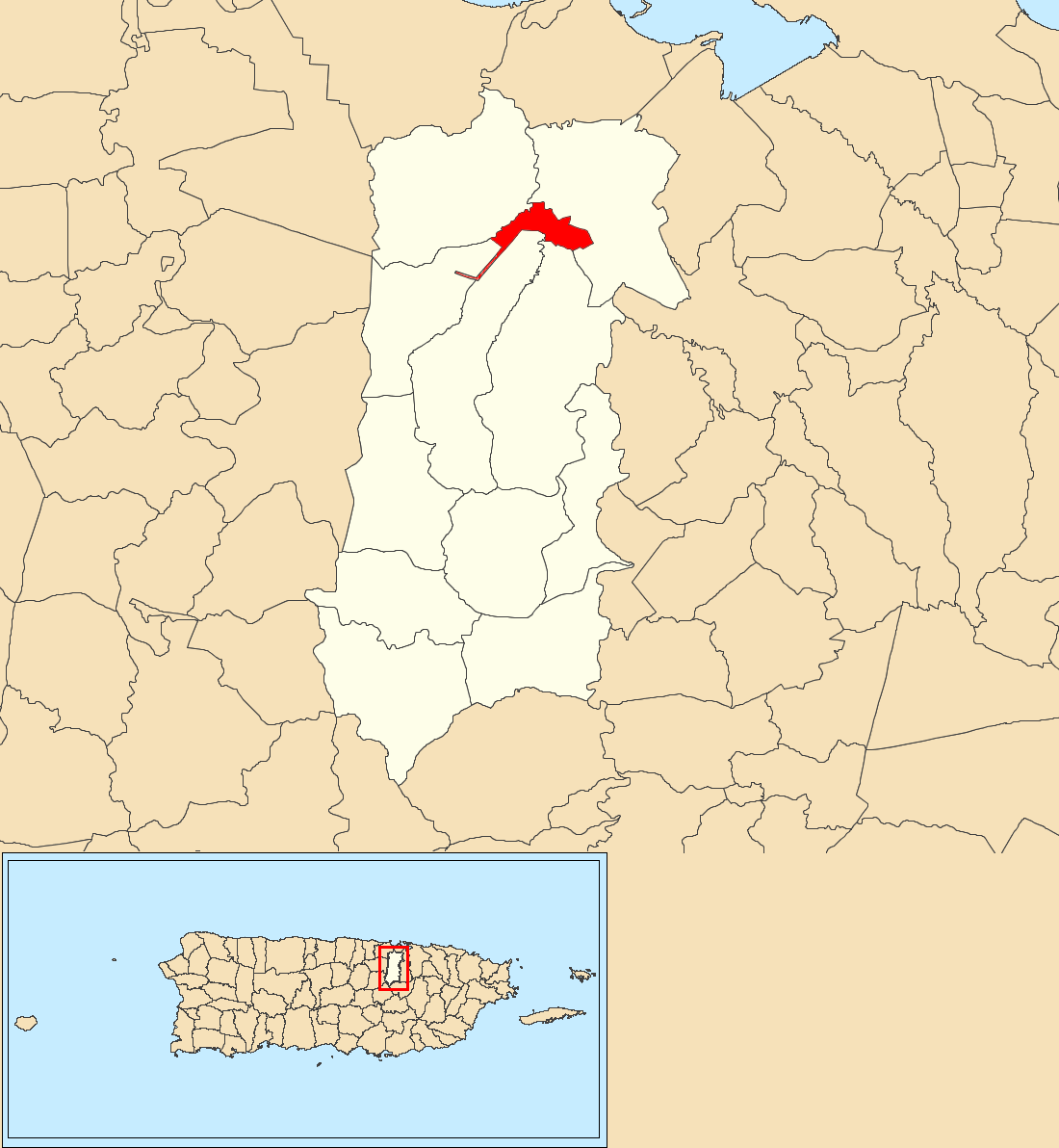
- Location of Bayamón barrio-pueblo within the municipality of Bayamón shown in red

- Location of Puerto Rico
- Coordinates: 18°23′41″N 66°09′15″W
- Commonwealth: Puerto Rico
- Municipality: Bayamón

Area
  - Total: 0.64 sq mi (1.7 km^{2})
  - Land: 0.64 sq mi (1.7 km^{2})
  - Water: 0.00 sq mi (0 km^{2})
- Elevation: 20 ft (6.1 m)

Population (2010)
  - Total: 4,746
  - Density: 3,760.9/sq mi (1,452.1/km^{2})
- Source: 2010 Census
- Time zone: UTC−4 (AST)

Bayamón is a barrio and the administrative center (seat) of Bayamón, a municipality of Puerto Rico. Its population in 2010 was 4,746.

As was customary in Spain, in Puerto Rico, the municipality has a barrio called pueblo which contains a central plaza, the municipal buildings (city hall), and a Catholic church. Fiestas patronales (patron saint festivals) are held in the central plaza every year.

== The central plaza and its church ==
The central plaza, or square, is a place for official and unofficial recreational events and a place where people can gather and socialize from dusk to dawn. The Laws of the Indies, Spanish law, which regulated life in Puerto Rico in the early 19th century, stated the plaza's purpose was for "the parties" (celebrations, festivities) (Spanish: a propósito para las fiestas), and that the square should be proportionally large enough for the number of neighbors (Spanish: grandeza proporcionada al número de vecinos). These Spanish regulations also stated that the streets nearby should be comfortable portals for passersby, protecting them from the elements: sun and rain.

Located across from the central plaza in Bayamón barrio-pueblo is the church Parroquia Invención de la Santa Cruz. The parish church in Bayamón was first built in 1772 and made of wood. The second church made of masonry sustained damages as a result of an earthquake in 1867 and was repaired in 1868.

== History ==
Bayamón barrio-pueblo was in Spain's gazetteers until Puerto Rico was ceded by Spain in the aftermath of the Spanish–American War under the terms of the Treaty of Paris of 1898 and became an unincorporated territory of the United States. In 1899, the United States Department of War conducted a census of Puerto Rico finding that the population of Bayamón Pueblo was 2,218.

Historical population
| Census | Pop. | Note | %± |
|---|---|---|---|
| 1900 | 2,218 | | — |
| 1910 | 5,272 | | 137.7% |
| 1920 | 10,411 | | 97.5% |
| 1930 | 12,986 | | 24.7% |
| 1940 | 14,596 | | 12.4% |
| 1950 | 20,171 | | 38.2% |
| 1960 | 15,109 | | −25.1% |
| 1970 | 0 | | −100.0% |
| 1980 | 6,722 | | — |
| 1990 | 5,785 | | −13.9% |
| 2000 | 5,336 | | −7.8% |
| 2010 | 4,746 | | −11.1% |
U.S. Decennial Census; 1899 (shown as 1900) 1910-1930; 1930-1950 1980-2000 2010

== Gallery ==
Places in Bayamón barrio-pueblo:

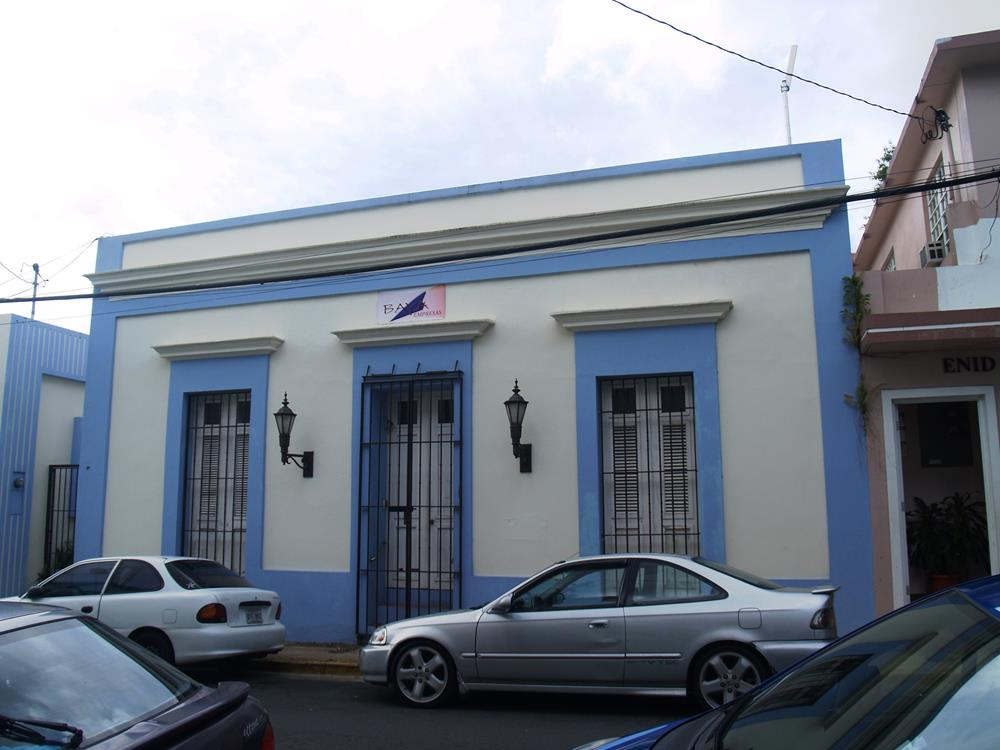
Historic building named Casa Stahl, 2015

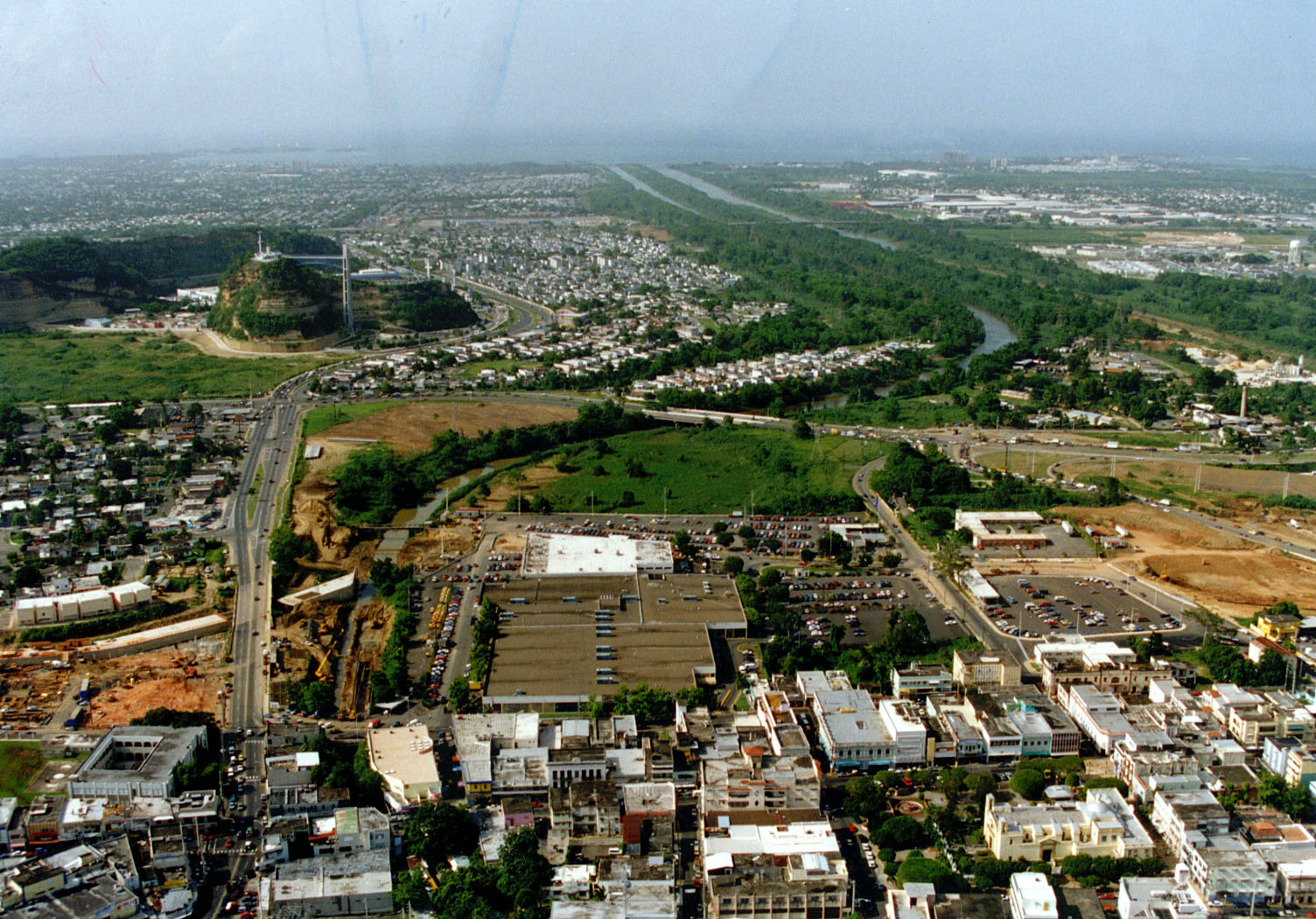
Aerial view shows Bayamón River Canton Mall (center), and Parque de las Ciencias (upper left), 1999

== See also ==
- List of communities in Puerto Rico
