= Toa Baja barrio-pueblo =

Historical and administrative center (seat) of Toa Baja, Puerto Rico

Toa Baja barrio-pueblo Pueblo de Toa Baja
- Municipality Seat
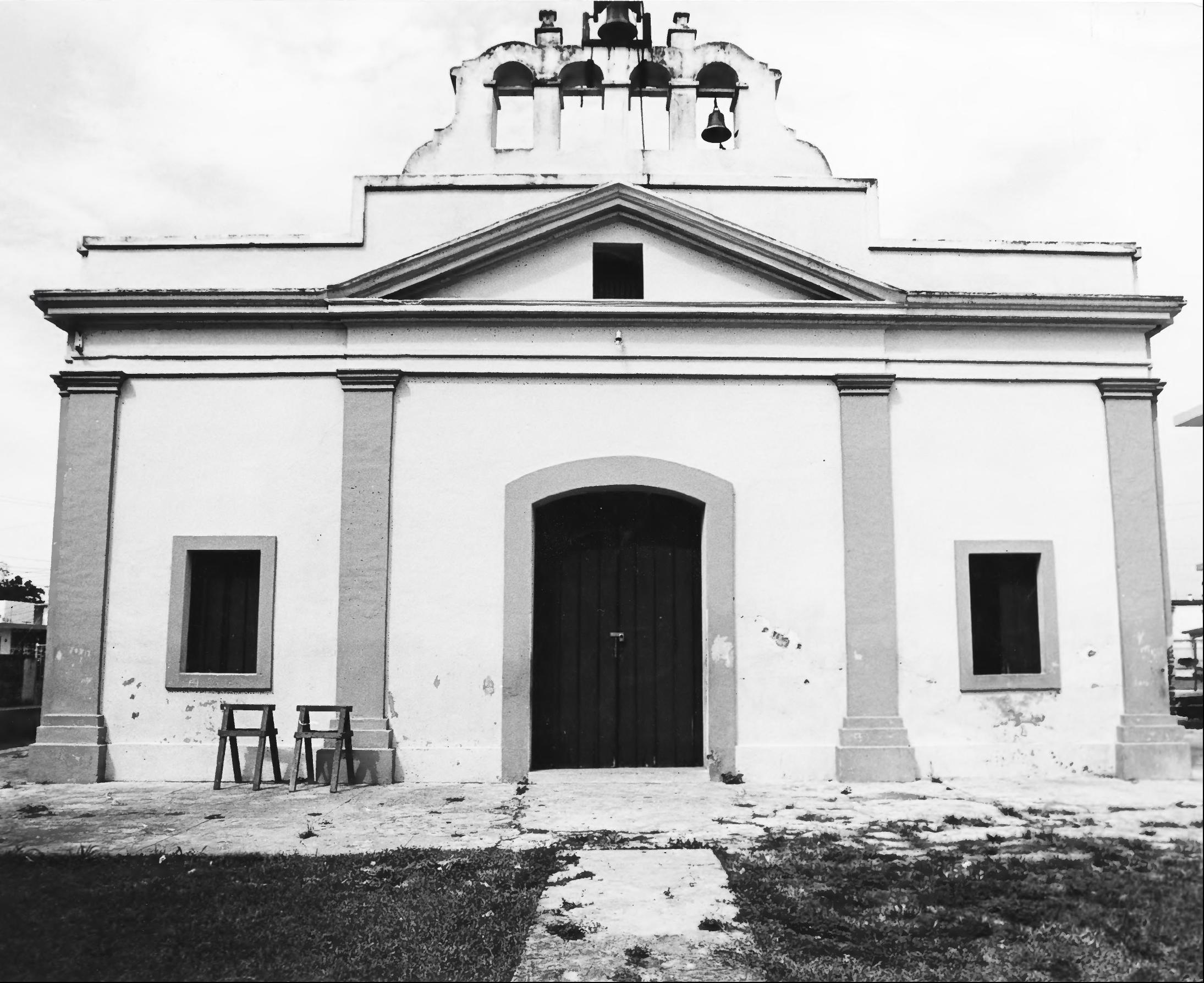
- Parroquia San Pedro Apostol in Toa Baja barrio-pueblo

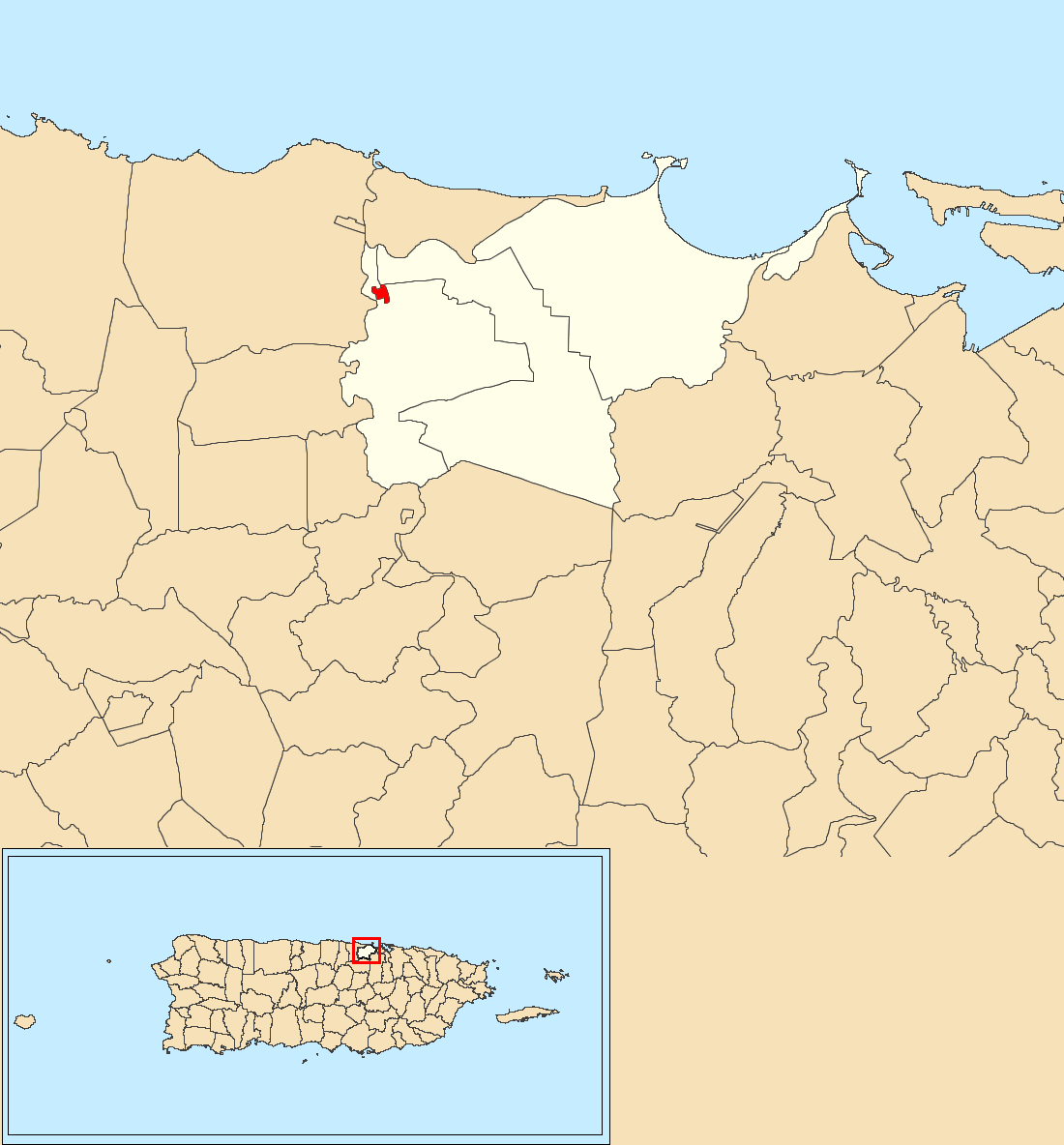
- Location of Toa Baja barrio-pueblo within the municipality of Toa Baja shown in red

- Location of Puerto Rico
- Coordinates: 18°26′32″N 66°15′14″W
- Commonwealth: Puerto Rico
- Municipality: Toa Baja

Area
  - Total: 0.05 sq mi (0.13 km^{2})
  - Land: 0.05 sq mi (0.13 km^{2})
  - Water: 0 sq mi (0 km^{2})
- Elevation: 23 ft (7.0 m)

Population (2010)
  - Total: 565
  - Density: 11,300/sq mi (4,400/km^{2})
- Source: 2010 Census
- Time zone: UTC−4 (AST)
- Area code: 787/939

Toa Baja barrio-pueblo is a barrio and the administrative center (seat) of Toa Baja, a municipality of Puerto Rico. Its population in 2010 was 565.

As was customary in Spain, in Puerto Rico, the municipality has a barrio called pueblo which contains a central plaza, the municipal buildings (city hall), and a Catholic church. Fiestas patronales (patron saint festivals) are held in the central plaza every year.

Historical population
Census	Pop.	Note	%±
1900	1,300		—
1910	1,759		35.3%
1920	1,559		−11.4%
1930	1,896		21.6%
1940	2,015		6.3%
1950	1,824		−9.5%
1960	1,084		−40.6%
1970	0		−100.0%
1980	892		—
1990	1,099		23.2%
2000	722		−34.3%
2010	565		−21.7%
U.S. Decennial Census; 1899 (shown as 1900) 1910-1930; 1930-1950 1980-2000 2010

== The central plaza and its church ==
The central plaza, or square, located in Toa Baja barrio-pueblo is a place for official and unofficial recreational events and a place where people can gather and socialize from dusk to dawn. The Laws of the Indies, Spanish law, which regulated life in Puerto Rico in the early 19th century, stated the plaza's purpose was for "the parties" (celebrations, festivities) (Spanish: a propósito para las fiestas), and that the square should be proportionally large enough for the number of neighbors (Spanish: grandeza proporcionada al número de vecinos). These Spanish regulations also stated that the streets nearby should be comfortable portals for passersby, protecting them from the elements: sun and rain.

Located across the central plaza in Toa Baja barrio-pueblo is the Parroquia San Pedro Apostol, a Roman Catholic church. A historic and important church, it is listed on the US National Register of Historic Places.

== History ==
Toa Baja barrio-pueblo was in Spain's gazetteers until Puerto Rico was ceded by Spain in the aftermath of the Spanish–American War under the terms of the Treaty of Paris of 1898 and became an unincorporated territory of the United States. In 1899, the United States Department of War conducted a census of Puerto Rico finding that the population of Toa Baja Pueblo was 1,300.

== Sectors ==
Barrios (which are, in contemporary times, roughly comparable to minor civil divisions) in turn are further subdivided into smaller local populated place areas/units called sectores (sectors in English). The types of sectores may vary, from normally sector to urbanización to reparto to barriada to residencial, among others.

The following sectors are in Toa Baja barrio-pueblo:

Residencial Ángel E. Melecio, Residencial El Toa, Urbanización Rochdale, Urbanización San Pedro, and Urbanización Toa Ville.

== See also ==
- List of communities in Puerto Rico
- List of barrios and sectors of Toa Baja, Puerto Rico
