= Church of San Mateo de Cangrejos of Santurce =

Historic church in Puerto Rico

- U.S. National Register of Historic Places
- Puerto Rico Historic Sites and Zones
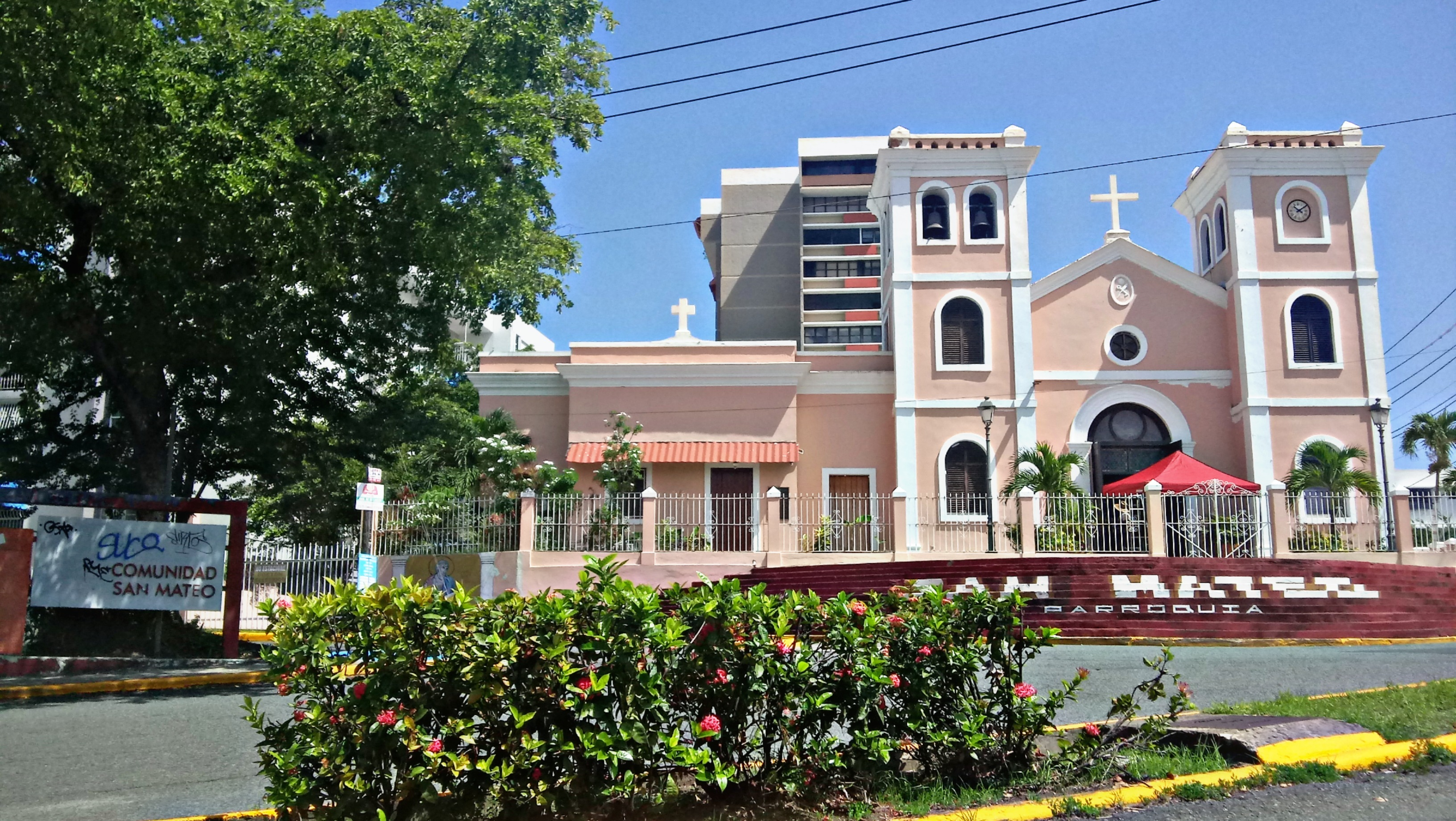
- The main entrance faces south

- Location within Puerto Rico
- Location: Corner of San Jorge St. and Eduardo Conde Ave., Santurce, San Juan, Puerto Rico
- Coordinates: 18.4447910°N 66.0633748°W
- Area: less than one acre
- Built: 1832
- Architect: Pedro Cobreros
- NRHP reference No.: 85000044
- RNSZH No.: 2000-(RMSJ)-00-JP-SH

Significant dates
- Added to NRHP: January 2, 1985
- Designated RNSZH: February 3, 2000

Church of San Mateo de Cangrejos of Santurce (La Iglesia San Mateo de Cangrejos en Santurce) is an Afro–Puerto Rican Catholic church in Santurce, San Juan, Puerto Rico.

== History ==
It was built in 1832 as a chapel for formerly enslaved Afro–Puerto Ricans, maroons, and immigrants from elsewhere in the Caribbean. It took its name from the surrounding village, which was later renamed Santurce and absorbed into San Juan, the capital of Puerto Rico. As such, the church differs from others in Puerto Rico because it is not related to a municipality's urban center. The building is located at the highest elevation of Santurce, which allows for a view of the entire district.

In 1896, state architect Pedro Cobreros, who designed other churches in Puerto Rico, reconstructed the church's facade and enlarged the interior. The church continues to maintain an Afro–Puerto Rican and migrant-serving identity and was heavily damaged in Hurricane Maria in 2017. It is currently undergoing restoration efforts as of February 2026.

== Architecture ==
Its large facade has two towers with three stories in between. This feature is known as westwork; (a west-facing entrance with towers, a vestibule, and a chapel). However, in the case of this church, its main entrance faces south. Curved steps lead up to the main entrance. The church, oriented from north to south, deviates from the traditional east to west orientation. On the west side of the church is a small parish house built in the same style as the church. The buildings are separated by a fence and a garden.

The interior main floor follows the basilica form with two lateral naves which are divided by means of an arcade of six bays resting on pillars. Each bay has a small rectangular window. Originally, the nave had a flat wooden roof which has been replaced by one of exposed beams of concrete. The square apse is roofed with a dome that rests on pendentives. The floors are made of marble and have been placed diagonally from the main axis. The church had a choir floor which no longer exists and had four portholes, now closed, to illuminate the altar.

The building has retained its original character. The two main changes since its original construction have been the expansion of the sacristy and the installation of an air conditioning system.

== See also ==
- Church San José of Aibonito
- Iglesia de San Carlos Borromeo
