= Academia San Jorge =

Private, elementary school, middle school, high school, in Santurce, San Juan

Saint George Academy
- Academia San Jorge

Location
- 1701 Colon st. (corner of San Jorge Ave.); Santurce, San Juan; Puerto Rico
- Coordinates: 18°27′2″N 66°3′42″W

Information
- Type: Private, Elementary School, Middle School, High School, (Spanish language instruction. English and French languages are also taught)
- Motto: Pro Aris Et Focis ("Our Home in Our Hearts")
- Denomination: Roman Catholic
- Established: 1925
- Oversight: Archdiocese of San Juan de Puerto Rico
- Grades: PK-12
- Gender: Coeducational
- Enrollment: 500 (2006-2007)
- Colors: Red and White
- Mascot: Dragon
- Accreditation: Middle States Association of Colleges and Schools
- Affiliations: Catholic, Roman Catholic Archdiocese of San Juan de Puerto Rico, School Sisters of Notre Dame
- Website: www.academiasanjorge.com

Academia San Jorge ("Saint George Academy") is a private, Roman Catholic school in San Juan, Puerto Rico founded in 1925 by Rev. Msgr. José M. Rivera as a parochial school with 53 students from grades K–3. Shortly after, the school started construction on the first building, which still exists today, and added grades 4–12. The school is located on San Jorge Avenue in San Juan's Santurce district.

== History ==
In 1939, the Sisters of St. Joseph came to teach and administer the school until their departure in 1973.

In 1959, its founder Msgr. José M. Rivera died and was replaced as parish priest by father Benito Cabrera. Father Cabrera started a campaign to remodel the school and the church, but was replaced in 1962 by Msgr. Thomas Maysonet who administered the school until 1972.

A major physical addition was constructed during his administration and was dedicated in 1965. This construction is the present school building.

In 1972, Msgr. Perfecto Pérez took over the parish and the administration of the school until 1977 when San Jorge became the first school under direct supervision of the Superintendent of Catholic Schools of the Archdiocese of San Juan. At this time a new administration under Mr. Lawrence C. Oleksiak reorganized the school.

In 1979 Mr. Oleksiak returned to the United States and was replaced as Director by the principal Mrs. María Colon de Marxuach who served as its Director until 1991.

In 1982 the school officially became accredited by the Middle States Association. An accreditation it still hold.

In 1983, a special program for Learning Disabled students was established in what was once the old convent building for the sisters. At this time, the installation of air–conditioning in the classrooms in the old convent building was begun. This program was expanded to include a Self–Contained program in 1991.

In 1991, Mrs. María T. Ambruso became the new Director. Also at that time, the school's finances were centralized by the Superintendence of Catholic Schools of San Juan along with all the other Archdiocesan schools. In 1992 the school received its 2nd ten year accreditation extension from the Middle States Association.

In 1996, a reconstruction of the schools main volleyball and basketball court was made due to damage caused by hurricane Hortense with the generous contribution of the Angel Ramos Foundation.

During the summer recess of 1997, the entire school building and the annex were re–painted with a new color scheme. Also in 1997 the Parents Association paid for the much needed repair of the electrical system in the annex building.

In 1998 Mrs. Vanesa V. Valdés became the new Director of the school on the retirement of Mrs. Ambruso, and in 1999 Mrs. Martiza Rosario was appointed Principal of the School and Mrs. María Teresa Vidal was appointed Vice Principal.

In 2001, the school entrance was replaced and a new school emblem in mosaic was added as well as the statue of our patron Saint was moved to the entrance of the school.

In 2003, the school library was completely redesigned and modernized and the Third floor of the old building was rebuilt.
