= Invención de la Santa Cruz Parish =

Church located in Bayamón, Puerto Rico

Invención de la Santa Cruz Church
- Parroquia de la Invención de la Santa Cruz
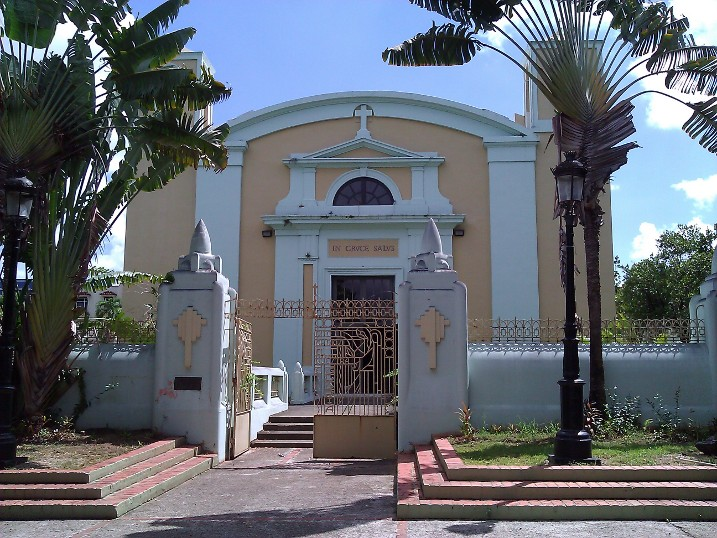
- View of the church in 2012

- Location in Puerto Rico
- 18°23′41″N 66°09′15″W
- Location: Bayamón Pueblo
- Address: 12 Degetau Street, Bayamón, Puerto Rico
- Denomination: Roman Catholic Church

History
- Status: Parish
- Founded: 1750
- Dedication: Exaltation of the Holy Cross
- Dedicated: 1772

Architecture
- Heritage designation: Puerto Rico Register of Historic Sites and Zones
- Designated: February 3, 2000
- Architect: Jose Martinez de Matos
- Groundbreaking: 1750
- Completed: 1799

Administration
- Archdiocese: San Juan de Puerto Rico
- Church Santa Cruz of Bayamón
- U.S. National Register of Historic Places
- Built: 1750-1799
- MPS: Historic Churches of Puerto Rico MPS
- NRHP reference No.: 84003162
- Added to NRHP: September 18, 1984

Invención de la Santa Cruz (Spanish for Invention of the Holy Cross) is a historic Catholic parish church located in Bayamón Pueblo, the historic and administrative downtown area of Bayamón, Puerto Rico. The church is located on the Plaza de Hostos, the main town square of Bayamón, at 12 Degetau Street, in front of the former city hall and current Francisco Oller Museum building.

== History ==
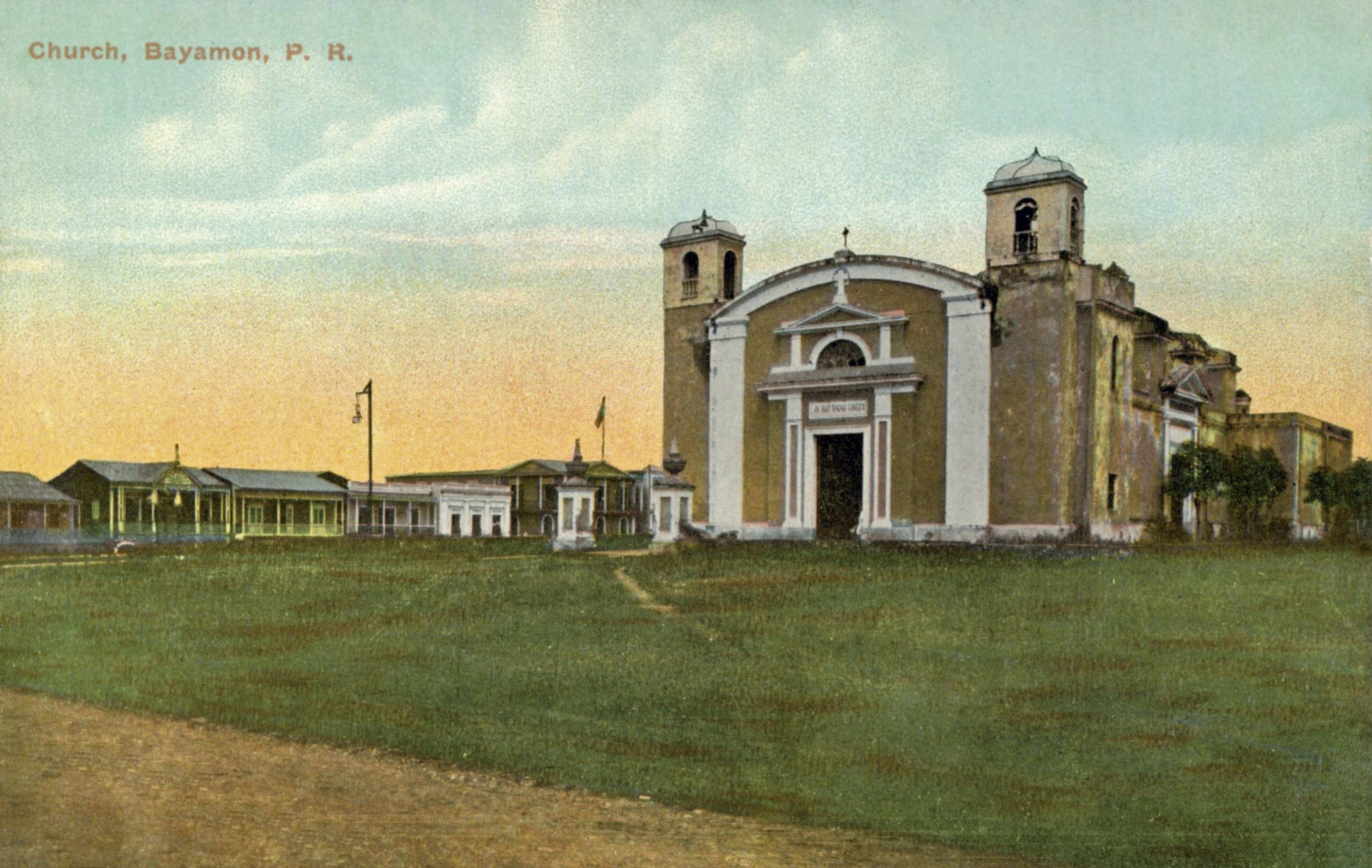
Print of the church in 1911

The establishment of the current church dates to 1750 when construction of the structure began with plans to move the main Catholic parish of the area from its former location next to Hacienda Santa Cruz to the current location, then known as Alto del Embarcadero, a small hill located close to the Bayamón River. Construction of the church was gradual and lasted for the remaining of the century with important updates being made in 1772 (the current church structure) and 1782. The consecration of the church in 1772, dedicated to the feast of the Holy Cross, also coincides with the official founding of the municipality of Bayamón on May 22, 1772.

The church sustained some damage during the 1867 Virgin Islands earthquake.

The church was nominated to the National Register of Historic Places on August 8, 1984, and consequently listed on September 18, 1984. It was one of 31 Puerto Rican churches reviewed for listing on the National Register in 1984 as part of the Historic Churches of Puerto Rico Inventory multiple property submission (MPS). It was also added to the Puerto Rico Register of Historic Sites and Zones in 2000.

== See also ==
- List of National Register of Historic Places in Puerto Rico
