= Church of Nuestra Señora de la Concepción y San Fernando of Toa Alta =

Historic church in Toa Alta, Puerto Rico

- Church Nuestra Señora de la Concepción y San Fernando of Toa Alta
- U.S. National Register of Historic Places
- Puerto Rico Historic Sites and Zones
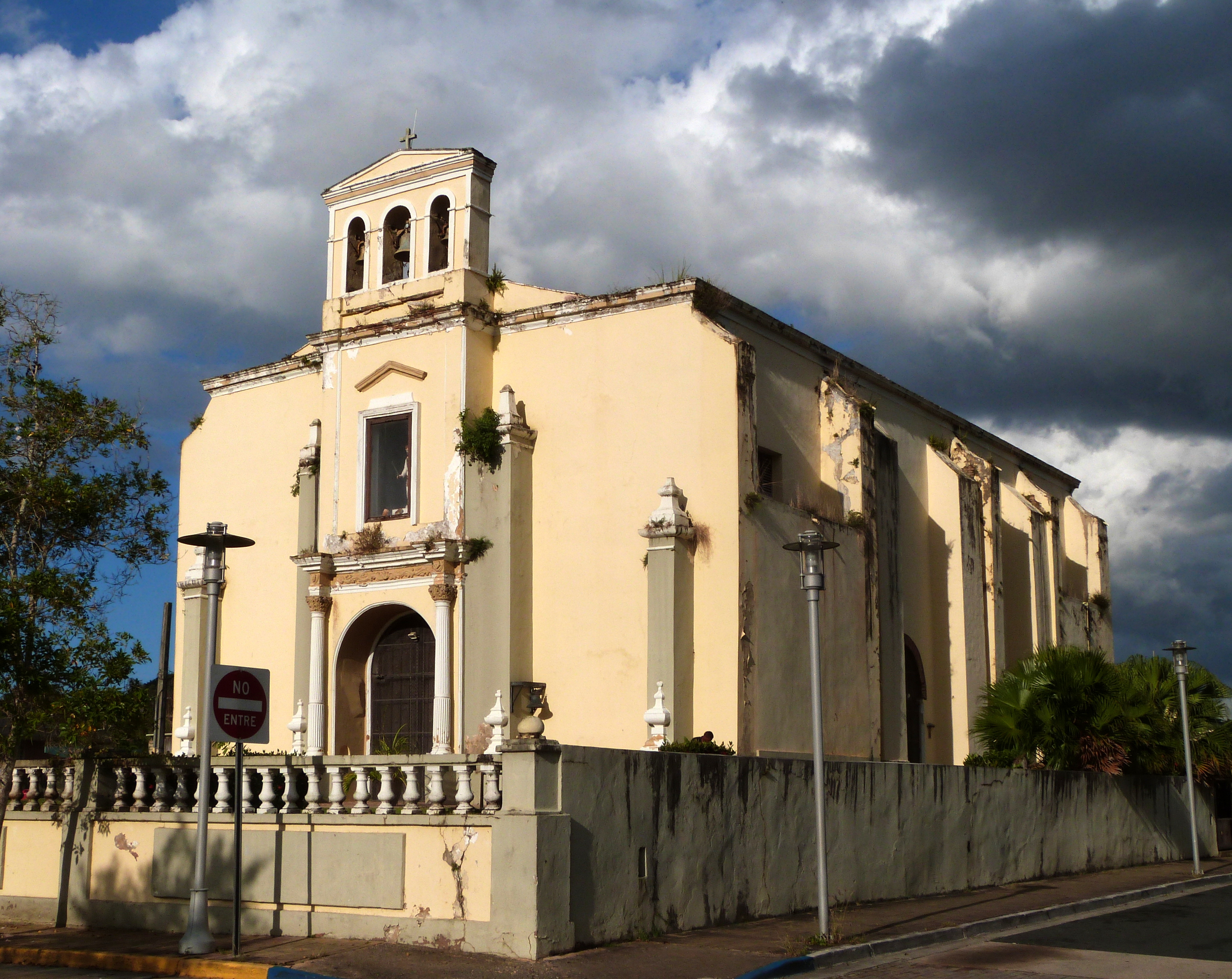
- The church building in 2017.

- Location within Puerto Rico
- Location: Ponce de León Street, Town Plaza of Toa Alta, Puerto Rico
- Coordinates: 18°23′18″N 66°14′50″W
- Built: 1752
- Architectural style: No style listed
- MPS: Historic Churches of Puerto Rico MPS
- NRHP reference No.: 84003158
- RNSZH No.: 2000-(RMSJ)-00-JP-SH

Significant dates
- Added to NRHP: September 18, 1984
- Designated RNSZH: February 3, 2000

The Church of Nuestra Señora de la Concepción y San Fernando of Toa Alta (Spanish: Iglesia de Nuestra Señora de la Concepción y San Fernando de Toa Alta), better known as the Church of San Fernando of Toa Alta (Iglesia San Fernando de Toa Alta), is a historic Roman Catholic parish church located in the main town square (plaza pública) of Toa Alta Pueblo, the administrative and historic center of the municipality of Toa Alta, Puerto Rico.

The original church dates to 1752, but the building was remodeled in 1826. It is a prime example of the churches built from 1720 to 1820 in Puerto Rico that have a single nave covered with a barrel vault. The church was added to the National Register of Historic Places (NRHP) on September 18, 1984 and on the Puerto Rico Register of Historic Sites and Zones in 2000. It is one of the 31 church buildings listed in the Puerto Rico State Historic Preservation Office's Inventory of the Historic Churches, and part of the Historic Churches of Puerto Rico MPS.

== Gallery ==
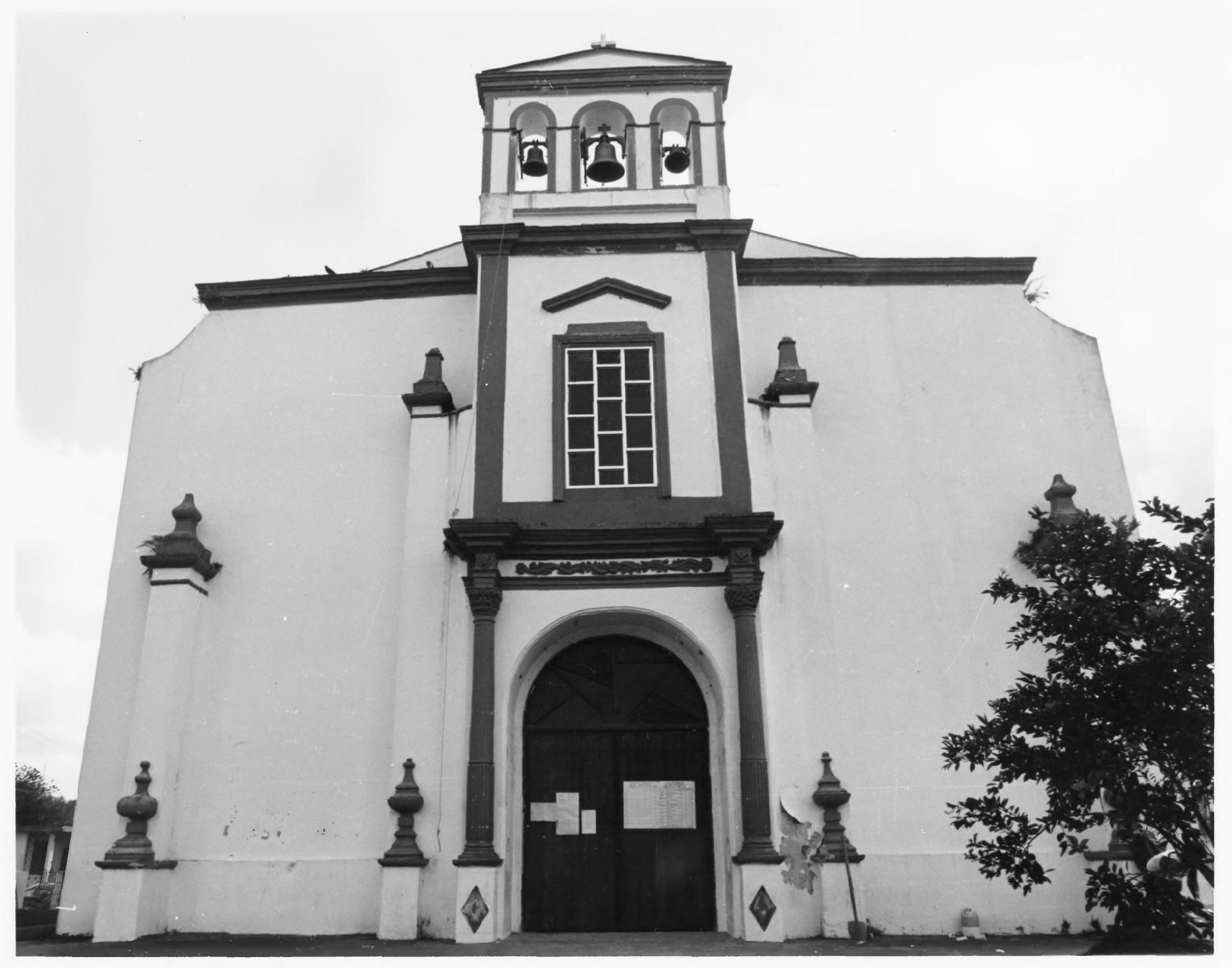
Church façade in 1984.

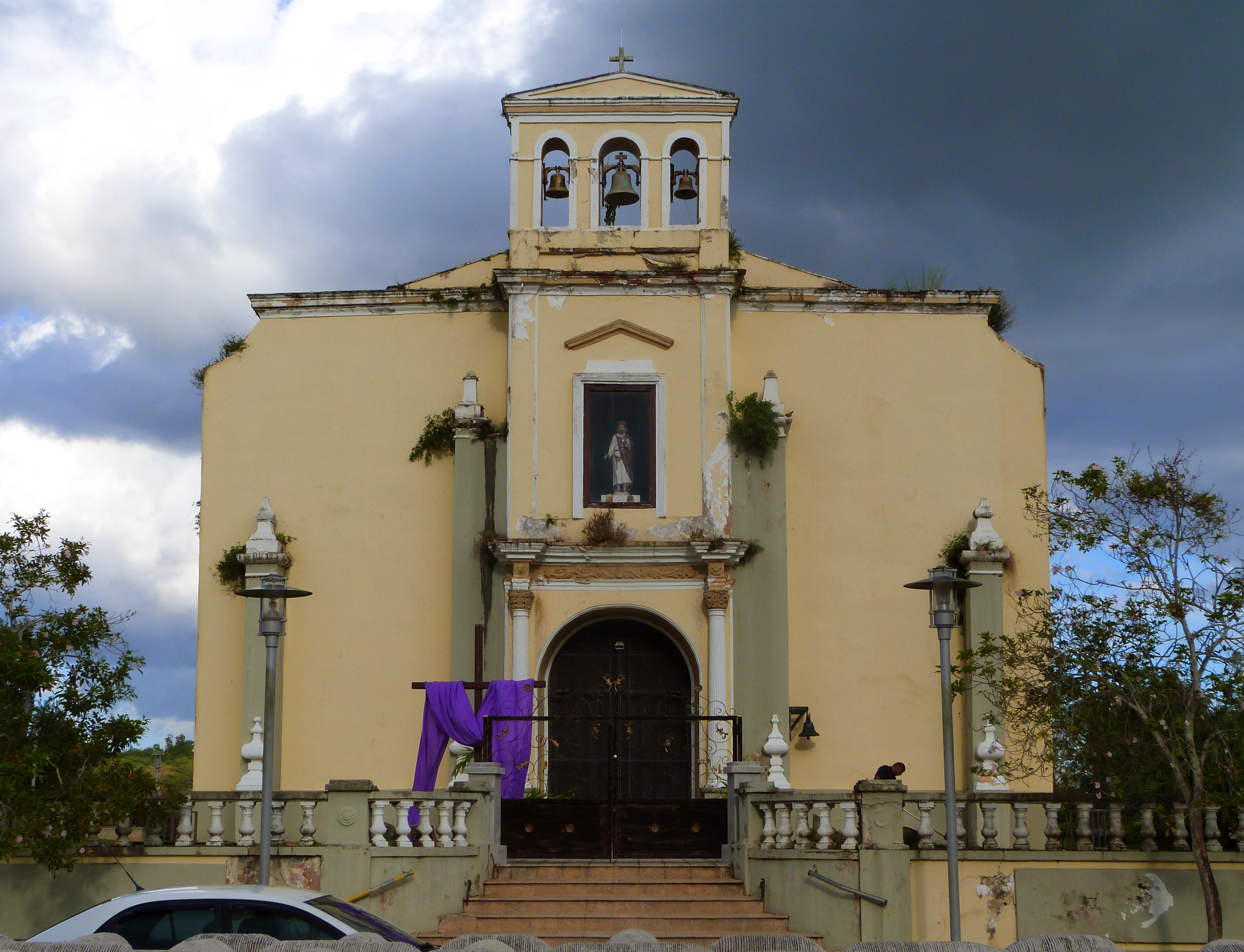
Church façade in 2017.

== See also ==
- National Register of Historic Places listings in northern Puerto Rico
