= Church San José of Aibonito =

Historic church in Aibonito, Puerto Rico

San José Church
- San José de Aibonito Parish Church
- Parroquia San José
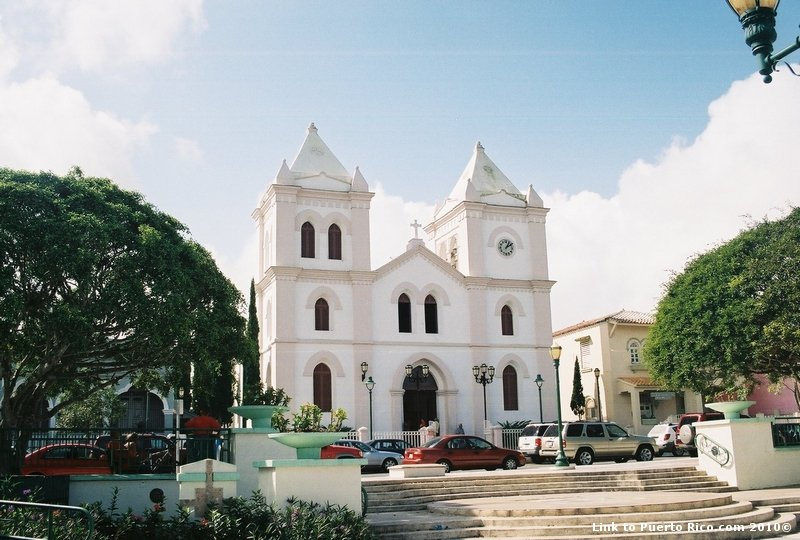
- The church in 2010

- Location in Puerto Rico
- 18°08′20″N 66°15′59″W
- Location: Aibonito Pueblo, Aibonito, Puerto Rico
- Address: Emeterio Betances Street, 55 Geronimo Martinez, Aibonito, 00705
- Country: Puerto Rico
- Denomination: Roman Catholic Church
- Website: parroquiasanjoseaibonito.com

History
- Status: Parish
- Founded: 1825
- Dedication: Saint Joseph
- Consecrated: 1897

Architecture
- Heritage designation: Puerto Rico Register of Historic Sites and Zones
- Designated: December 21, 2000
- Architect: Pedro Cobreros
- Architectural type: Spanish Colonial
- Years built: 1887-1897

Administration
- Diocese: Caguas
- Church San José of Aibonito
- U.S. National Register of Historic Places
- Built: 1897
- MPS: Historic Churches of Puerto Rico MPS
- NRHP reference No.: 84003124
- Added to NRHP: December 10, 1984

Church San José of Aibonito, on the town plaza of Aibonito, Puerto Rico, was built over the ten-year period from 1887 to 1897. It was listed on the U.S. National Register of Historic Places in 1984, and on the Puerto Rico Register of Historic Sites and Zones in 2000. It has the distinction of being the last church building to be constructed under the colonial government of the Spanish Crown in the Americas.

== History ==
The first iteration of the San José Church on the main town square was built in 1825, a year after the official founding of Aibonito on March 13, 1824. The current church was built over a span of 10 years between the years 1887 and 1897 due to financial difficulties. The official opening of the church in February 1897 coincided with a state visit of General Romualdo Palacios, the Spanish colonial Governor of Puerto Rico at the time.

San José is one of five churches designed by Puerto Rico State Architect Pedro Cobreros. It was built from 1887 to 1897 and includes two aisles and a nave. It is also one of 31 Puerto Rican churches reviewed for listing on the National Register in 1984 as part of the Historic Churches of Puerto Rico multiple property submission (MPS).

The parish church today is part of the Roman Catholic Diocese of Caguas.

== See also ==
- National Register of Historic Places listings in central Puerto Rico
