= Church San Fernando of Carolina =

Historic church in Carolina Pueblo, Puerto Rico

- U.S. National Register of Historic Places
- Puerto Rico Historic Sites and Zones
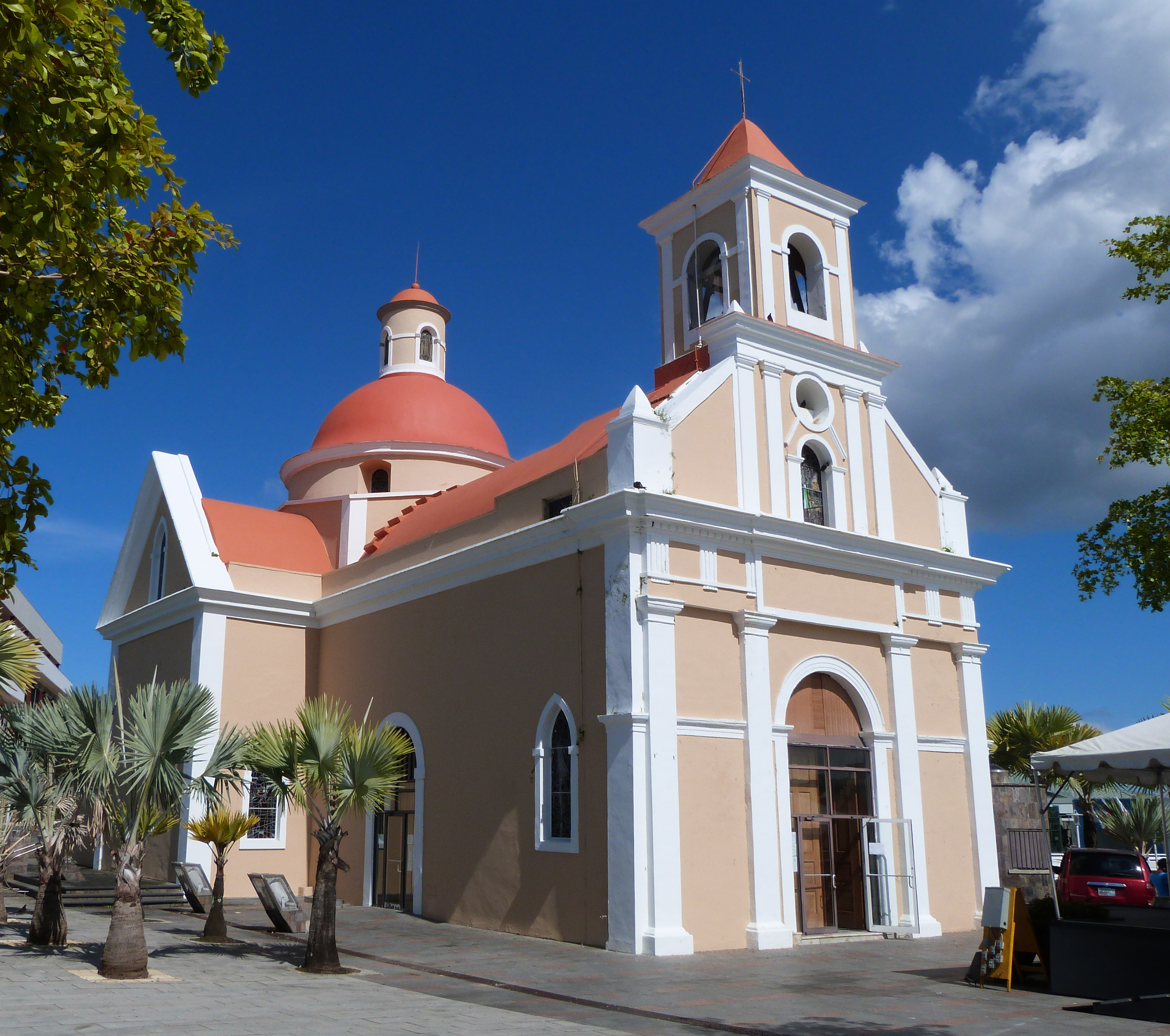
- Carolina parish church in 2017.

- Location within Puerto Rico
- Location: Main town square, Muñoz Rivera Street in Carolina, Puerto Rico
- Coordinates: 18°22′52″N 65°57′23″W
- Built: 1860-1862
- Architects: Antonio María de Vizcarrando, Lorenzo Mongrand
- NRHP reference No.: 84003160
- RNSZH No.: 2000-(RMSJ)-00-JP-SH

Significant dates
- Added to NRHP: September 18, 1984
- Designated RNSZH: February 3, 2000

The Church of San Fernando de La Carolina (Spanish: Iglesia San Fernando de la Carolina), also known as the San Fernando Rey Parish Church (Parroquia de San Fernando Rey), is a historic Catholic parish located in Carolina Pueblo, the historical and administrative center of the Puerto Rican municipality of Carolina. The church building was built between 1860 and 1862, with further modifications made in 1870 and 1984. The church was added to the United States National Register of Historic Places on September 18, 1984, and on the Puerto Rico Register of Historic Sites and Zones on February 3, 2000.

The parish church San Fernando of Carolina sits directly in front of the town square, with its entrance facing west. The church occupies the central space of a town block with structures on both sides restricting its space and reducing its view. It is separated from the street by an iron grillwork fence, enclosing a tiled area which surrounds the church on three of its sides. This church, as well as the one in Vega Baja, was designed by engineer Antonio Maria de Vizcarrondo y Guitian. Both churches are similar in their facades and in the arrangement of interior spaces, the one in Carolina being the smaller of the two.

== Gallery ==
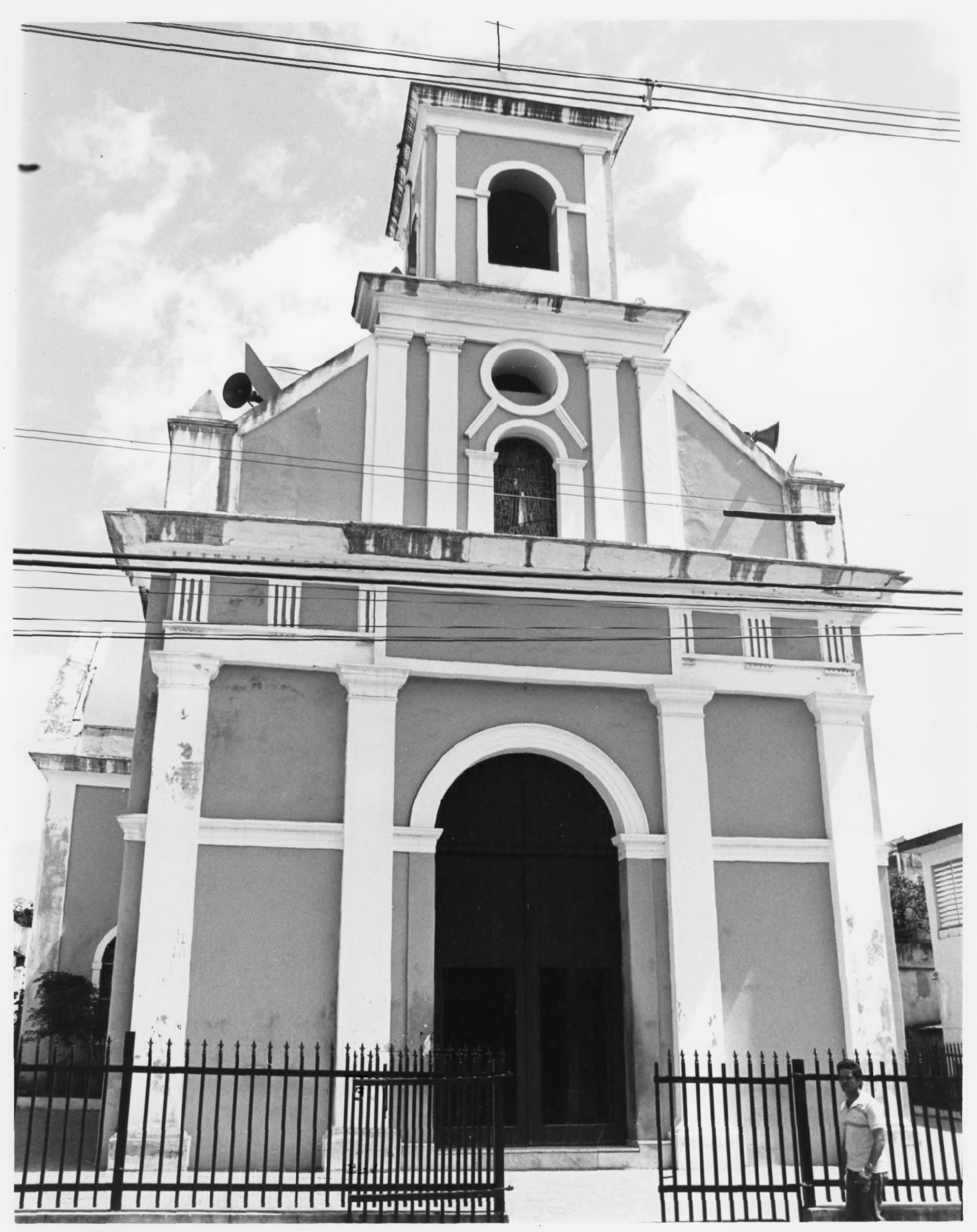
San Fernando church in 1984.
