= Iglesia Parroquial de San Pedro Apóstol de Toa Baja =

Historic church in Toa Baja Pueblo, Puerto Rico

- Iglesia Parroquial de San Pedro Apostol de Toa Baja
- U.S. National Register of Historic Places
- Puerto Rico Historic Sites and Zones
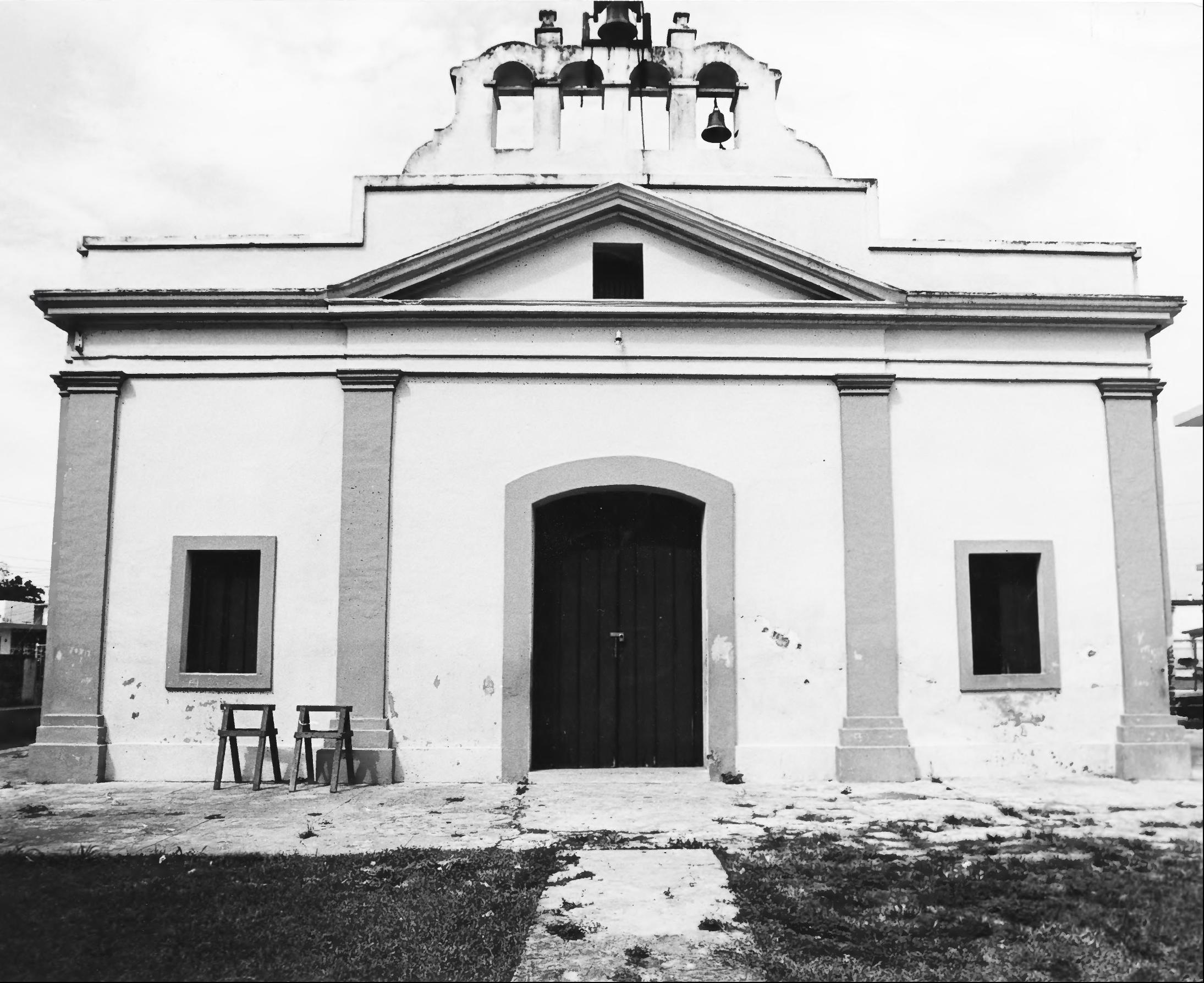
- The church in 1975

- Location within Puerto Rico
- Location: 150 Cristo and 47 Las Flores Streets Toa Baja Pueblo in Toa Baja, Puerto Rico
- Coordinates: 18°26′33″N 66°15′18″W
- Built: 1750-1799
- Architect: Unknown
- NRHP reference No.: 75002135
- RNSZH No.: 2000-(RMSJ)-00-JP-SH

Significant dates
- Added to NRHP: April 17, 1975
- Designated RNSZH: February 3, 2000

The Saints Peter and Matthew the Apostles Parish Church of Toa Baja (Spanish: Iglesia Parroquial de los Apóstoles San Pedro y San Matías), better known as the St. Peter the Apostle Parish Church of Toa Baja (Iglesia Parroquial de San Pedro Apóstol de Toa Baja), is a historic 16h-century Roman Catholic parish church located in the main town square (plaza pública) of Toa Baja Pueblo, the administrative and historic center of the municipality of Toa Baja, Puerto Rico.

The church is notable for having its façade facing the La Plata River rather than the town square as it is usual in Puerto Rican towns (pueblos). Local tradition states that this was due to historical floods and consequent modifications made to the church. A small chapel that dated to before the official founding of Toa Baja used to occupy the site of the current church. The current façade, similar to that of the parish church of Vega Alta, dates to the 18th century. The church is of artistic notability for its chiseled gold and silver rococo ornamentations, described by Iñigo Abbad y Lasierra in 1775 as one of the best adorned in the island.

== See also ==
- National Register of Historic Places listings in northern Puerto Rico
