= Iglesia Parroquial de San Pedro Mártir de Guaynabo =

Puerto Rican historic place

- U.S. National Register of Historic Places
- Puerto Rico Historic Sites and Zones
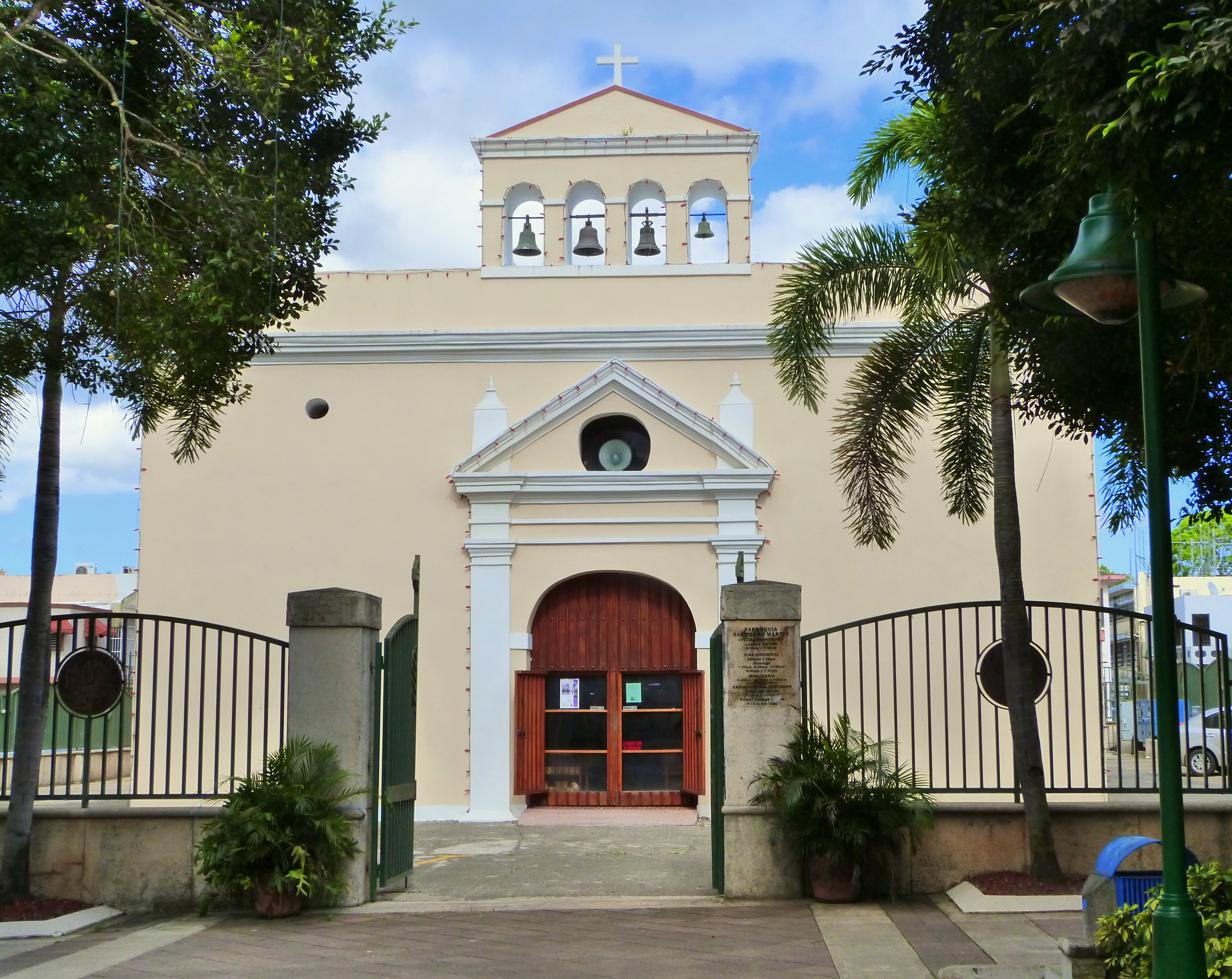
- Church façade in 2017.

- Location within Puerto Rico
- Location: Plaza de Recreo of Guaynabo, Puerto Rico
- Coordinates: 18°21′28″N 66°6′42″W
- Built: 1750
- Architectural style: Spanish Colonial
- NRHP reference No.: 76002250
- RNSZH No.: 2000-(RMSJ)-00-JP-SH

Significant dates
- Added to NRHP: September 8, 1976
- Designated RNSZH: February 3, 2000

The San Pedro Mártir Parish Church of Guaynabo (Spanish: Iglesia Parroquial de San Pedro Mártir de Guaynabo) is a historic parish church of the Roman Catholic Archdiocese of San Juan de Puerto Rico, located in Guaynabo Pueblo (downtown Guaynabo) in the Puerto Rican municipality of the same name. The church was added to the United States National Register of Historic Places on September 8, 1976, and to the Puerto Rico Register of Historic Sites and Zones in 2000.

The church is the oldest building in Guaynabo, and it was established as a parish in 1775. The structure itself is older, dating to at least 1750 when it was a chapel used by the farming communities in the area. It has remained in use as a parish church and as such it has witnessed the growth of Guaynabo from an isolated farming town into a suburb of metropolitan San Juan. The church is representative of the structures built by the Spanish in their Caribbean colonial towns, conveying in its simplicity the economic and artistic limitations of the islands. It was these limitations that perpetuated the adaptable and stern forms of the herreriano and the plateresque manifestations of Spanish Renaissance into such a late date.

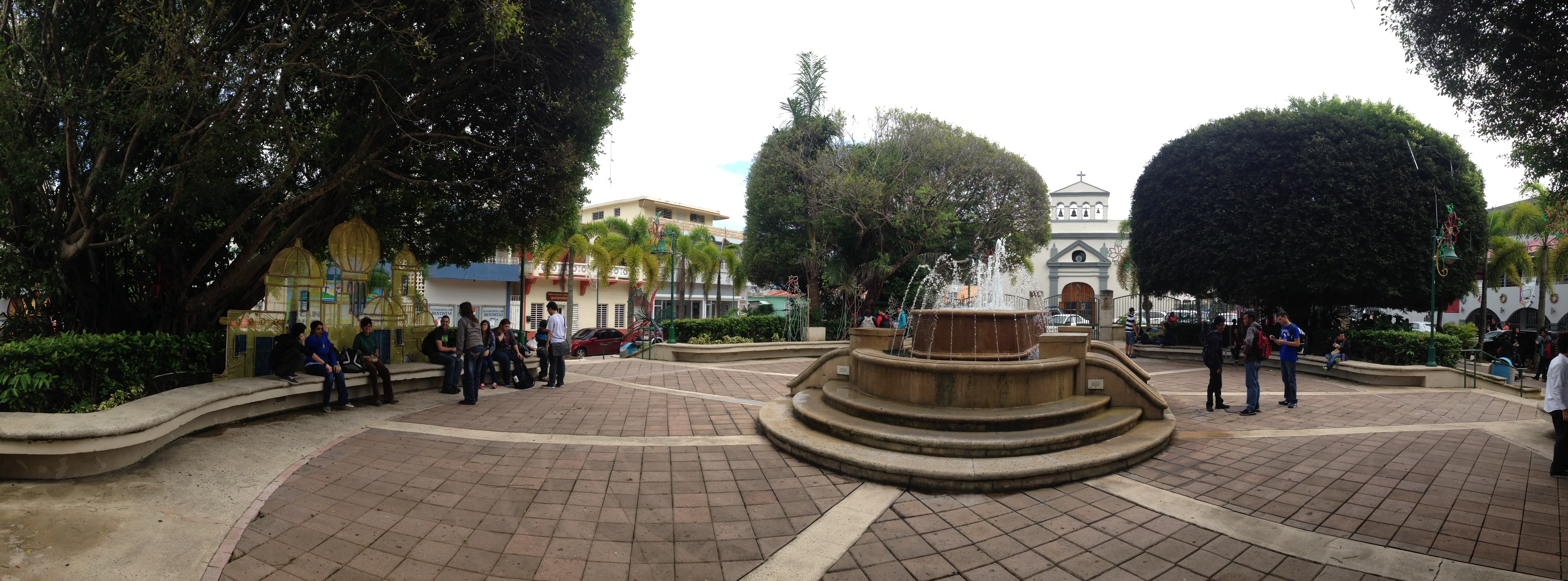
Guaynabo's town square in 2013. The church façade can be seen in the background.

The plaza, which forms an integral part of this site, has been the center of activity of the traditional community, and together with the church marks the core of the historic colonial core of Guaynabo.
