= Pueblos in Puerto Rico =

Administrative, historic and cultural center of a municipality in Puerto Rico

Pueblo is a term primarily used in Puerto Rico to refer to the municipal district (barrio) that serves as the administrative, historic and cultural center of a municipality. The concept of pueblo is often used locally as analogous to the concept of downtown in U.S. cities. Pueblos are officially called barrio-pueblo by the United States Census since 1990.

== Overview ==
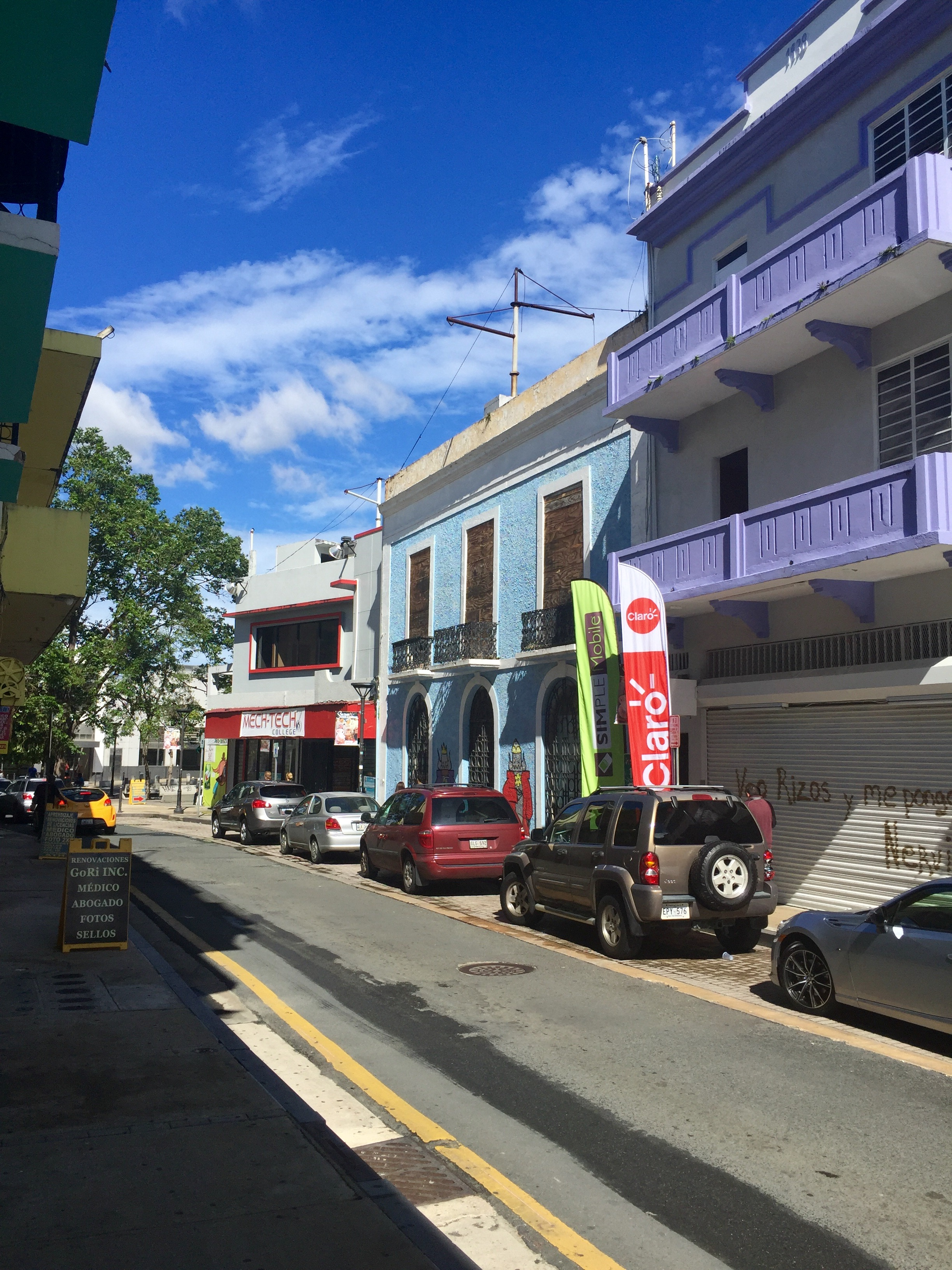
City hall building of the former municipality of Río Piedras

The Spanish word pueblo translates to 'town' in English, since many of these correspond to the original European-founded settlements in their respective contemporary municipalities; however, its usage in Puerto Rican Spanish today corresponds more closely to the concept of downtown in English. In some cases, the concept of pueblo might also refer to municipality, but the term municipality never applies to pueblos. With a few exceptions, the barrio-pueblo is also the historic district of the municipality and usually contains the main town square (plaza, and in some cases, plaza de armas) surrounded by the municipal administrative buildings (alcaldía) and the main Catholic church in town (either a cathedral or parish church).

The central plaza or square, is a place for official and unofficial recreational events and a place where people can gather and socialize. The Laws of the Indies, the Spanish law which regulated life in Puerto Rico in the early 19th century, stated the plaza's purpose was for celebrations and festivities (Spanish: a propósito para las fiestas), most notably the town patron saint festivals (fiestas patronales), and that the square should be proportionally large enough for the number of neighbors (Spanish: grandeza proporcionada al número de vecinos). These Spanish regulations also stated that the streets nearby should be comfortable portals for passersby, protecting them from the elements: sun and rain.

As of the 2010 census, Mayagüez is the most populated pueblo in Puerto Rico with a population of 26,903, while Las Marías has the lowest population with 262 inhabitants. The largest barrio-pueblo in Puerto Rico is Fajardo with a total area of 3.23 square miles, while Toa Alta is the smallest with an area of 0.03 square miles.

=== Exceptions ===
Although all barrio-pueblos correspond to the administrative and downtown area of Puerto Rican municipalities, some barrios and clusters of barrios (such as in Ponce) also function and are categorized as the pueblos of their respective municipalities. The municipality of San Juan is a good example of this: the barrios Pueblo and San Juan Antiguo correspond to the pueblos of the former municipalities of Río Piedras and San Juan (pre-1951). Both of these contained a main town square or plaza de armas with a city hall and a church. When San Juan and Río Piedras merged into a single municipality in 1951, the former pueblo of Río Piedras retained its name. Florida and Ponce are the two other municipalities in Puerto Rico that do not contain a designated barrio-pueblo. The exception of Florida is due to the fact that the municipality has no barrios, while Ponce does not have a single designated barrio-pueblo but six barrios that correspond to the pueblo of Ponce.

The name of the pueblo almost always is the name as the municipality is located in. For example, the barrio-pueblo of the municipality of Caguas is also called Caguas (Pueblo de Caguas). The exception to this occurs with the island municipalities of Culebra and Vieques. Although the barrio-pueblo of Culebra is known as Culebra (Pueblo de Culebra) today, its former name used to be Dewey, while the name of the barrio-pueblo of Vieques today remains Isabel II. Both of these are also the main settlements of the islands they are located in.

== History ==
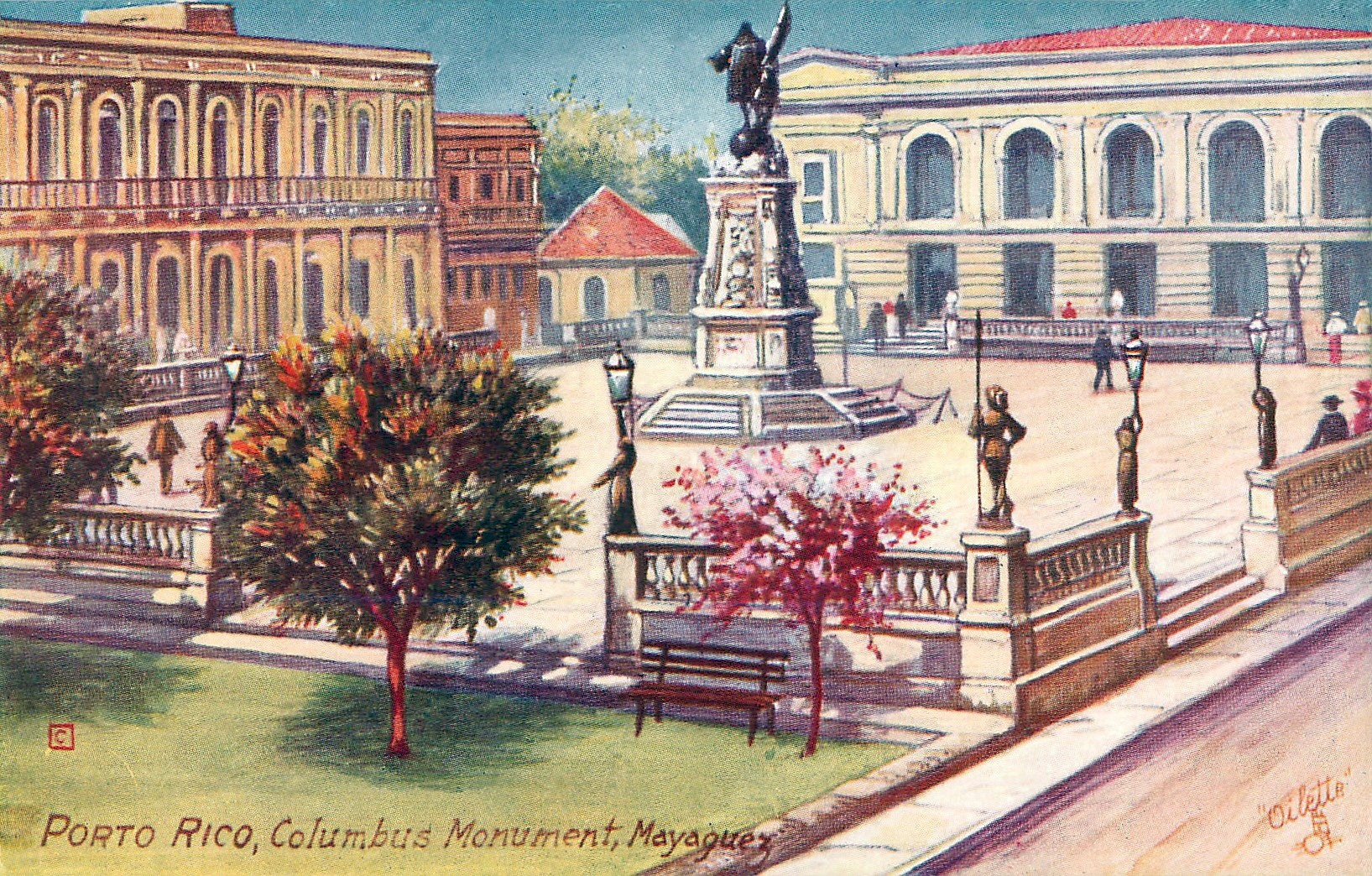
1905 postcard depicting Colón Square, the main plaza of the pueblo of Mayagüez where the city hall and Catholic cathedral are located

Although the urban zones that today are designated as barrio-pueblo have existed since the Spanish colonization of Puerto Rico, the concept of barrio was first used in the island during the 19th century. Historians have speculated the creation of barrios as administrative units may have been related to the Puerto Rican representation at the Cortes of Cádiz. All municipalities in the island had a distinct barrio officially called pueblo (this is where the contemporary usage of pueblo in Puerto Rico comes from). Many of these pueblos used to have a certain degree of autonomy and local governance in the form of councils. Today barrios and barrio-pueblos have no political autonomy, and their designation is now for statistical and municipal management purposes. In 1980, they were still referred to as pueblos on the US Census. Beginning with the 1990 census, these pueblos have been officially referred to as barrio-pueblos by the United States Census Bureau.

== List of Pueblos ==
The following list includes all barrio-pueblos and equivalent barrios in Puerto Rico. The municipality of Florida is not included in the list as it has no barrios nor barrio-pueblos. Ponce today has no official barrio-pueblo designations, however six of its barrios (all given cardinal names, i.e., 'first', 'second', 'sixth') correspond to the original core equivalent to the concept of barrio-pueblo today. The municipality of San Juan today, originally consisted of two separate municipalities with a barrio-pueblo each: San Juan Antiguo for the municipality of San Juan, and Pueblo for the former municipality of Río Piedras.

Pueblo	Designation	Municipality	Pop. (2010)	Area (sq. mi)	Plaza	Church
Adjuntas	barrio-pueblo	Adjuntas	4,406	0.75	Plaza Poeta Arístides Moll Boscana	San Joaquín y Santa Ana Church
Aguada	barrio-pueblo	Aguada	1,324	0.11	Plaza Cristóbal Colón	San Francisco de Asís Church
Aguadilla	barrio-pueblo	Aguadilla	3,627	0.74	Plaza Rafael Hernández Marín	San Carlos Borromeo Church
Aguas Buenas	barrio-pueblo	Aguas Buenas	1,711	0.18	Plaza Luis A. Ferré Aguayo	Los Tres Santos Reyes Church
Aibonito	barrio-pueblo	Aibonito	3,539	0.80	Plaza de Recreo de Aibonito	San José Church
Añasco	barrio-pueblo	Añasco	912	0.09	Plaza de Recreo de Añasco	San Antonio Abad Church
Arecibo	barrio-pueblo	Arecibo	8,488	2.62	Plaza Luis Muñoz Rivera	Cathedral of St. Philip the Apostle
Arroyo	barrio-pueblo	Arroyo	1,206	0.38	Plaza Samuel B. Morse	Nuestra Señora del Carmen Church
Barceloneta	barrio-pueblo	Barceloneta	435	0.04	Plaza José Cordero Rosario	Nuestra Señora del Carmen Church^{1}
Barranquitas	barrio-pueblo	Barranquitas	2,695	0.77	Plaza Pública Bicentenaria Monseñor Miguel Ángel Mendoza Rivera	San Antonio de Padua Church
Bayamón	barrio-pueblo	Bayamón	4,746	0.64	Plaza Licenciado Eugenio María de Hostos	Invención de la Santa Cruz Church
Cabo Rojo	barrio-pueblo	Cabo Rojo	1,078	0.10	Plaza Dr. Ramón Emeterio Betances y Alacán	San Miguel Arcángel Church
Caguas	barrio-pueblo	Caguas	22,406	2.67	Plaza Pública Santiago R. Palmer	Cathedral Dulce Nombre de Jesús
Camuy	barrio-pueblo	Camuy	3,354	0.95	Plaza Luis Muñoz Marín	San José Church
Canóvanas	barrio-pueblo	Canóvanas	4,060	1.25	Plaza Profesor Juan Francisco Arroyo Salamán	Nuestra Señora del Pilar Church
Carolina	barrio-pueblo	Carolina	1,201	0.08	Plaza Rey Fernando III	San Fernando Church
Cataño	barrio-pueblo	Cataño	4,283	1.05	Plaza de Recreo de Cataño	Nuestra Señora del Carmen Church
Cayey	barrio-pueblo	Cayey	15,298	2.45	Plaza Pública Ramón Frade de León	Nuestra Señora de la Asunción Church
Ceiba	barrio-pueblo	Ceiba	3,677	0.55	Plaza Felisa Rincón de Gautier	San Antonio de Padua Church
Ciales	barrio-pueblo	Ciales	1,009	0.11	Plaza Andrés Robles	Nuestra Señora del Rosario Church
Cidra	barrio-pueblo	Cidra	1,064	0.11	Plaza Francisco M. Zeno	Nuestra Señora del Carmen Church
Coamo	barrio-pueblo	Coamo	6,685	0.89	Plaza Luis Muñoz Rivera	San Blas de Illescas Church
Comerío	barrio-pueblo	Comerío	3,657	0.40	Plaza de la Trova	Santo Cristo de la Salud Church
Corozal	barrio-pueblo	Corozal	2,631	0.35	Plaza Presidente Franklin Delano Roosevelt	Sagrada Familia Church
Culebra	barrio-pueblo	Culebra	462	0.22	Plaza Pública de Culebra	Nuestra Señora del Carmen Church^{2}
Dorado	barrio-pueblo	Dorado	780	0.07	Plaza Pública de Dorado	San Antonio de Padua Church
Fajardo	barrio-pueblo	Fajardo	13,709	3.23	Plaza Antonio Rafael Barceló	Cathedral of St. James the Apostle
Guánica^{3}	barrio-pueblo	Guánica	3,514	0.98	Plaza Manuel Jiménez	San Antonio Abad Church
Guayama	barrio-pueblo	Guayama	16,891	2.47	Plaza Cristóbal Colón	San Antonio de Padua Church
Guayanilla	barrio-pueblo	Guayanilla	3,757	0.54	Plaza Luis Muñoz Marín	Inmaculada Concepción Church
Guaynabo	barrio-pueblo	Guaynabo	4,008	0.59	Plaza de Recreo Guaynabo	San Pedro Mártir Church
Gurabo	barrio-pueblo	Gurabo	1,509	0.11	Plaza Pública de Gurabo	San José Church
Hatillo	barrio-pueblo	Hatillo	3,117	0.84	Plaza José R. Millán	Nuestra Señora del Carmen Church
Hormigueros	barrio-pueblo	Hormigueros	1,204	0.23	Plaza Ramón S. Vélez Ramírez	Basilica of the Our Lady of Monserrat
Humacao	barrio-pueblo	Humacao	3,862	0.64	Plaza Luis Muñoz Rivera	Dulce Nombre de Jesús Co-Cathedral
Isabel II	barrio-pueblo	Vieques	1,207	0.50	Plaza Pública de Vieques Luis Muñoz Rivera	Santiago Apóstol Church
Isabela	barrio-pueblo	Isabela	7,826	1.46	Plaza Manuel María Corchado y Juarbe	San Antonio de Padua Church
Jayuya	barrio-pueblo	Jayuya	1,222	0.14	Plaza Nemesio Rosario Canales Rivera	Nuestra Señora de la Monserrate Church
Juana Díaz	barrio-pueblo	Juana Díaz	3,977	0.51	Plaza Román Baldorioty de Castro	San Ramón Nonato Church
Juncos	barrio-pueblo	Juncos	2,464	0.37	Plaza de Recreo Antonio R. Barceló	Inmaculada Concepción Church
Lajas	barrio-pueblo	Lajas	564	0.06	Plaza Juan Ramírez Ortiz	Nuestra Señora De Candelaria Church
Lares	barrio-pueblo	Lares	2,690	0.58	Plaza de la Revolución	San José Church
Las Marías	barrio-pueblo	Las Marías	262	0.06	Plaza San Carlos	Inmaculado Corazón de María Church
Las Piedras	barrio-pueblo	Las Piedras	1,500	0.18	Plaza de Recreo Las Piedras	Inmaculada Concepción Church
Loíza	barrio-pueblo	Loíza	3,875	0.66	Plaza Pública de Loíza	Espíritu Santo y San Patricio Church
Luquillo	barrio-pueblo	Luquillo	1,028	0.25	Plaza Rosendo Matienzo Cintrón	San José Church
Manatí	barrio-pueblo	Manatí	5,746	0.77	Plaza Luis Muñoz Rivera	Nuestra Señora de la Candelaria Church
Maricao	barrio-pueblo	Maricao	716	0.11	Plaza Pública de Maricao Luis Muñoz Rivera	San Juan Bautista Church
Maunabo	barrio-pueblo	Maunabo	317	0.14	Plaza de Recreo de Maunabo	San Isidro Labrador Church
Mayagüez	barrio-pueblo	Mayagüez	26,903	2.98	Plaza Pública Cristóbal Colón	Cathedral of Our Lady of the Candelaria
Moca	barrio-pueblo	Moca	1,735	0.32	Plaza José D. Quiñones	Nuestra Señora de la Monserrate Church
Morovis	barrio-pueblo	Morovis	895	0.07	Plaza Don Juan Evangelista Rivera	Nuestra Senora del Carmen Church
Naguabo	barrio-pueblo	Naguabo	1,514	0.25	Plaza Luis Muñoz Rivera	Nuestra Señora del Rosario Church
Naranjito	barrio-pueblo	Naranjito	1,157	0.12	Plaza de Recreo de Naranjito	San Miguel Arcángel Church
Orocovis	barrio-pueblo	Orocovis	682	0.11	Plaza Juan Rivera de Santiago	San Juan Bautista Church
Patillas	barrio-pueblo	Patillas	2,279	0.49	Plaza Pública de Patillas Adelina Cintrón	Inmaculado Corazón de María Church
Peñuelas	barrio-pueblo	Peñuelas	1,422	0.25	Plaza Pública de Peñuelas	San José Church
Ponce^{4}	consolidated	Ponce	17,152	1.42	Plaza Las Delicias	Cathedral of Our Lady of Guadalupe
Pueblo (Río Piedras)^{5}	barrio	San Juan	8,720	0.73	Plaza de la Convalecencia	Nuestra Señora del Pilar Church
Quebradillas	barrio-pueblo	Quebradillas	3,103	0.65	Plaza Luis Muñoz Rivera	San Rafael Church
Rincón	barrio-pueblo	Rincón	933	0.12	Plaza Pública de Rincón	Santa Rosa de Lima Church
Río Grande	barrio-pueblo	Río Grande	1,772	0.20	Plaza Pública de Río Grande	Nuestra Señora del Carmen Church
Sabana Grande	barrio-pueblo	Sabana Grande	1,554	0.11	Plaza Pública de Sabana Grande José A. Busigo	San Isidro Labrador Church
Salinas	barrio-pueblo	Salinas	2,453	0.46	Plaza Las Delicias	Nuestra Señora de la Monserrate Church
San Germán	barrio-pueblo	San Germán	2,660	0.33	Plaza Francisco Mariano Quiñones	San Germán de Auxerre Church
San Juan Antiguo	barrio	San Juan	7,085	2.63	Plaza de Armas	Cathedral Basilica of Saint John the Baptist^{6}
San Lorenzo	barrio-pueblo	San Lorenzo	2,045	0.22	Plaza Pública de San Lorenzo Policarpo Santana	Las Mercedes Church
San Sebastián	barrio-pueblo	San Sebastián	1,424	0.12	Plaza Ángel Gabriel Mislán Huertas	San Sebastián Mártir Church
Santa Isabel	barrio-pueblo	Santa Isabel	5,133	0.87	Plaza de los Fundadores^{7}	Santiago Apóstol Church
Toa Alta	barrio-pueblo	Toa Alta	397	0.03	Plaza Pública de Toa Alta	San Fernando Rey Church
Toa Baja	barrio-pueblo	Toa Baja	565	0.05	Plaza Virgilio Dávila	San Pedro Apostol Church
Trujillo Alto	barrio-pueblo	Trujillo Alto	673	0.15	Plaza Pública de Trujillo Alto	Exaltación de la Santa Cruz Church
Utuado	barrio-pueblo	Utuado	5,856	1.19	Plaza Pública de Utuado Sebastián Morfi	San Miguel Arcángel Church
Vega Alta	barrio-pueblo	Vega Alta	1,169	0.10	Plaza Gilberto Concepción de Gracia	Inmaculada Concepción Church
Vega Baja	barrio-pueblo	Vega Baja	816	0.11	Plaza José Francisco Náter	Santa María del Rosario Church
Villalba	barrio-pueblo	Villalba	729	0.15	Plaza José Ramón Figueroa Rivera	Nuestra Señora del Carmen Church
Yabucoa	barrio-pueblo	Yabucoa	2,593	0.52	Plaza Pública de Yabucoa	Church of the Holy Guardian Angels
Yauco	barrio-pueblo	Yauco	3,091	0.32	Plaza Pública Fernando de Pacheco y Matos	Church of the Holy Rosary

^{1}Barceloneta's main Catholic church is not located in the main town square because the present square was established in 1910 after the abolition of the Law of the Indies in Puerto Rico, and it has the distinction of being one of the few towns in Puerto Rico where the main church in front of the plaza is a Protestant (Pentecostal) rather than a Catholic church.

^{2}Culebra's main Catholic church is no longer located in front of the main town square.

^{3}Although the modern town of Guánica was founded in 1914, after the abolition of the Law of the Indies, its square, city hall and church were planned and built following the law's traditional urban planning parameters.

^{4}Ponce consolidated barrio-pueblo statistics include barrios Primero, Segundo, Tercero, Cuarto, Quinto, and Sexto.

^{5}Río Piedras was founded as a town and independent municipality in 1714 and despite being merged with the municipality of San Juan in 1951, it still preserves is main town square, church and former city hall building as established by the urban planning parameters of the Law of the Indies.

^{6}The cathedral was built in 1535, before the establishment of the Law of the Indies (1573) and therefore not located in the main town square of the city.

^{7}Santa Isabel's town square holds the distinction of being the first town plaza in Puerto Rico to host a purpose-built Protestant church (United Evangelical Church of Santa Isabel) in front of it.

== In pop culture ==
- The song "Me voy pa'l pueblo" by El Trío Los Panchos sings of going to the pueblo.

== Gallery ==
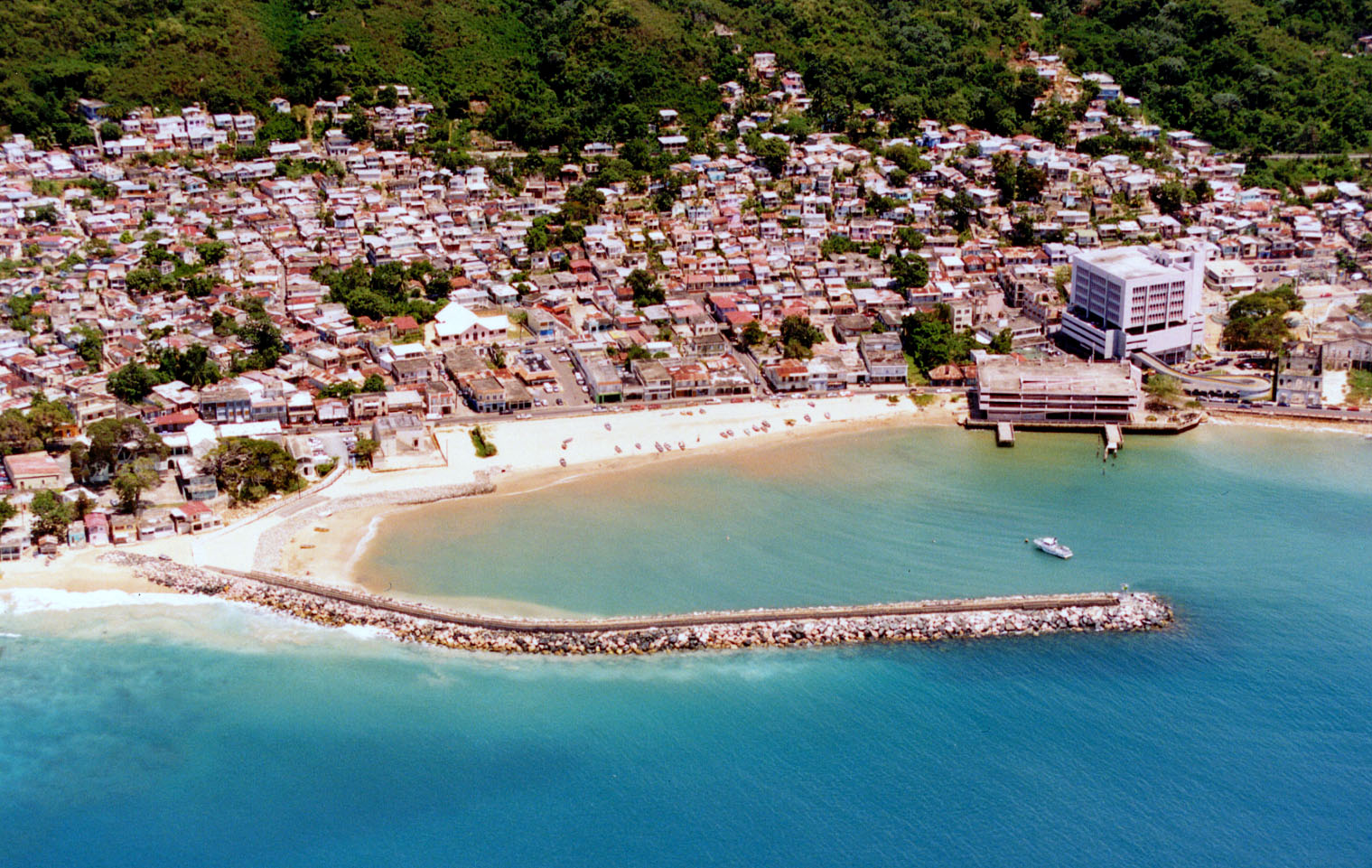
Aguadilla Pueblo and its harbor

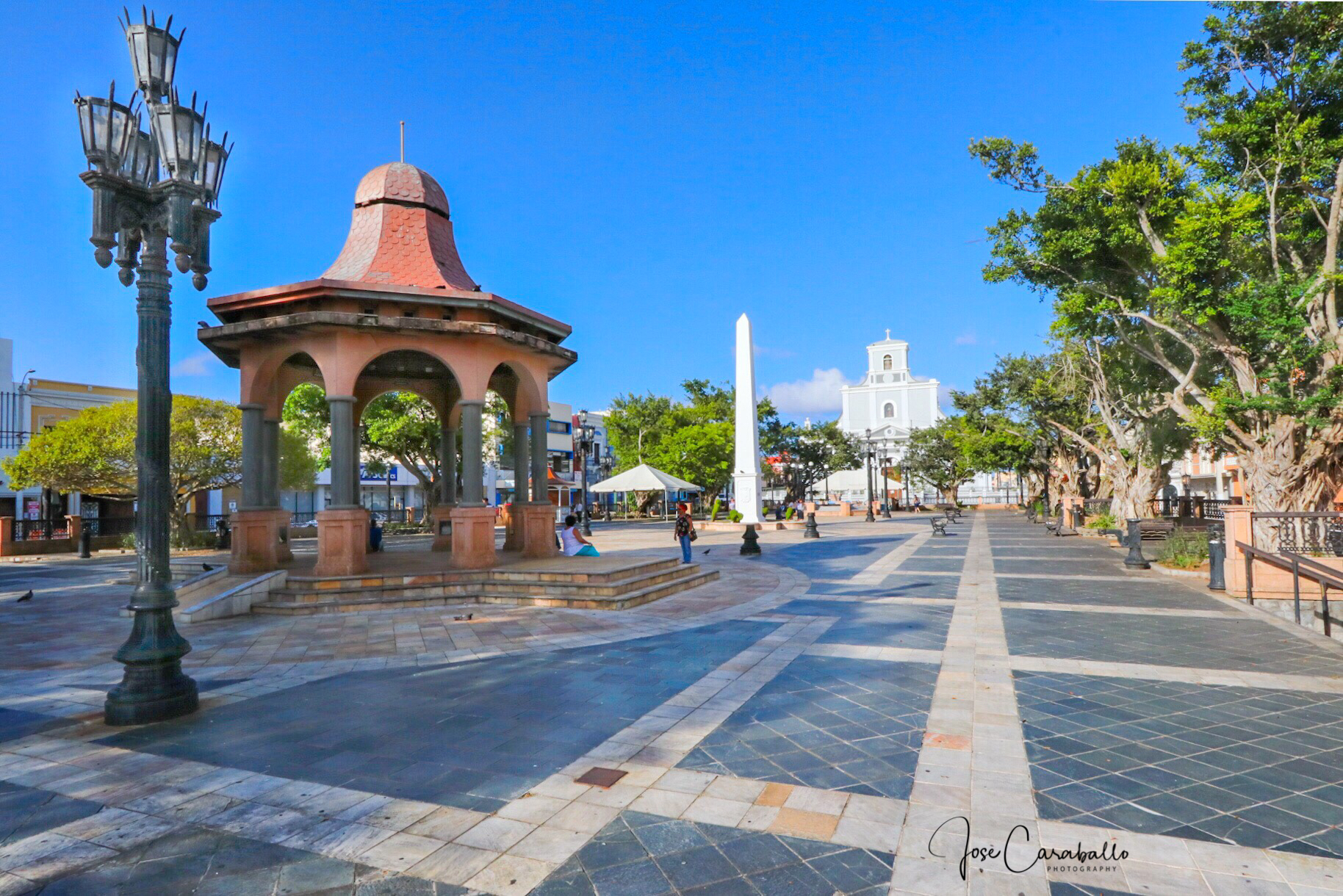
Plaza or main town square of the Arecibo Pueblo

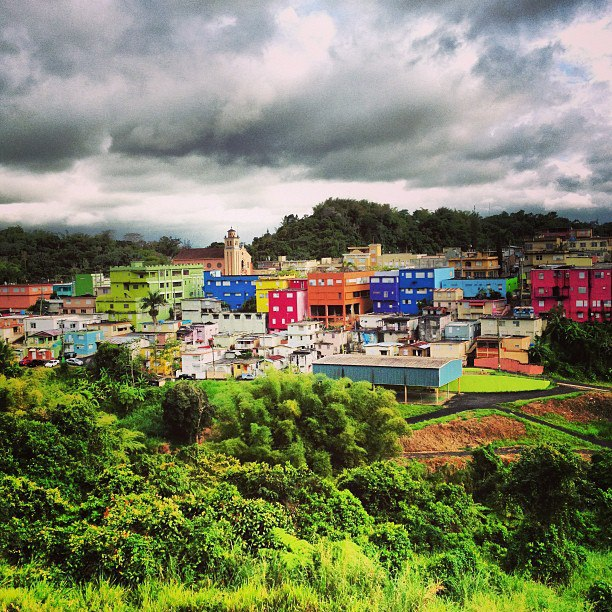
View of Barranquitas Pueblo from PR-152 (2013)

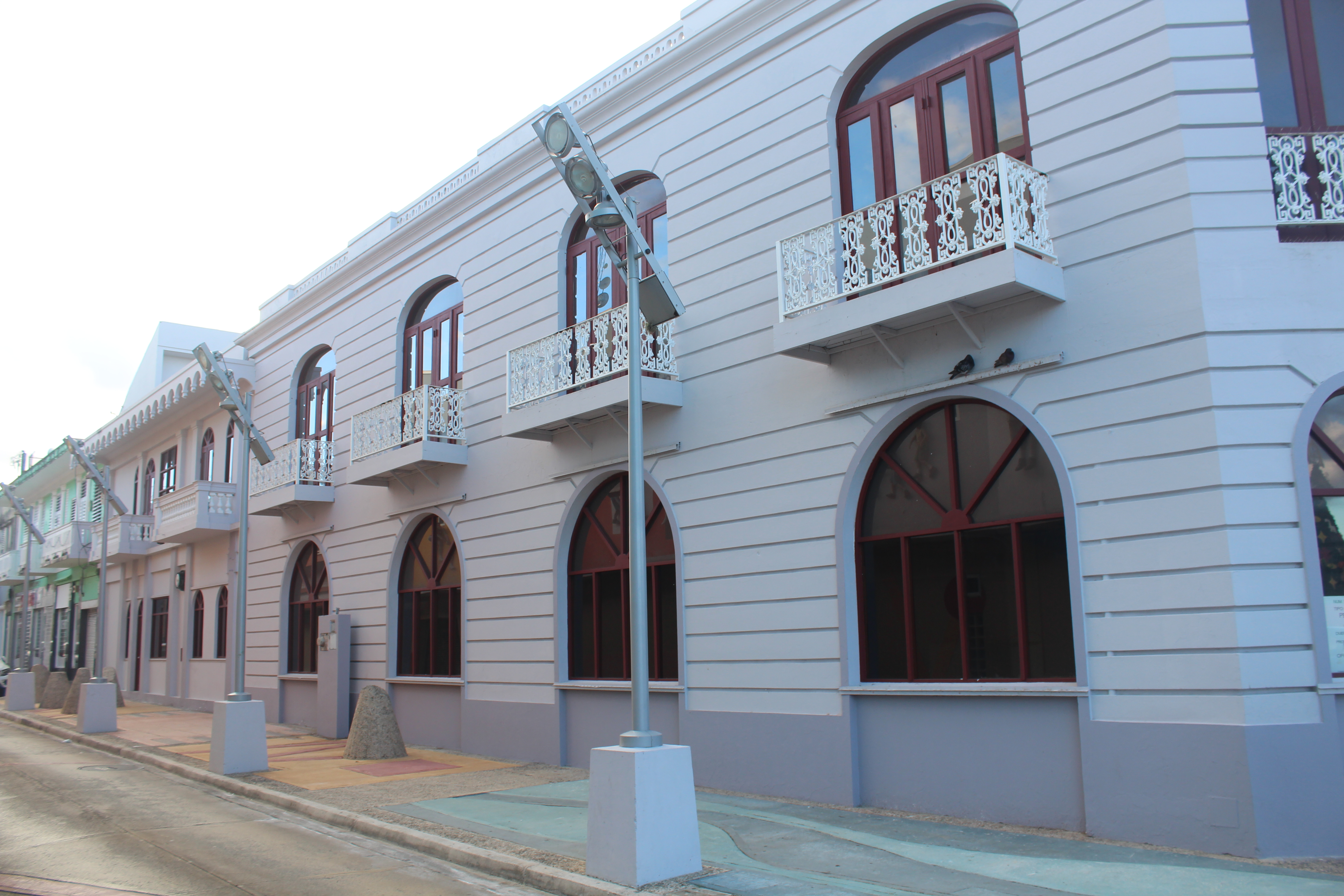
Historic architecture in Caguas Pueblo

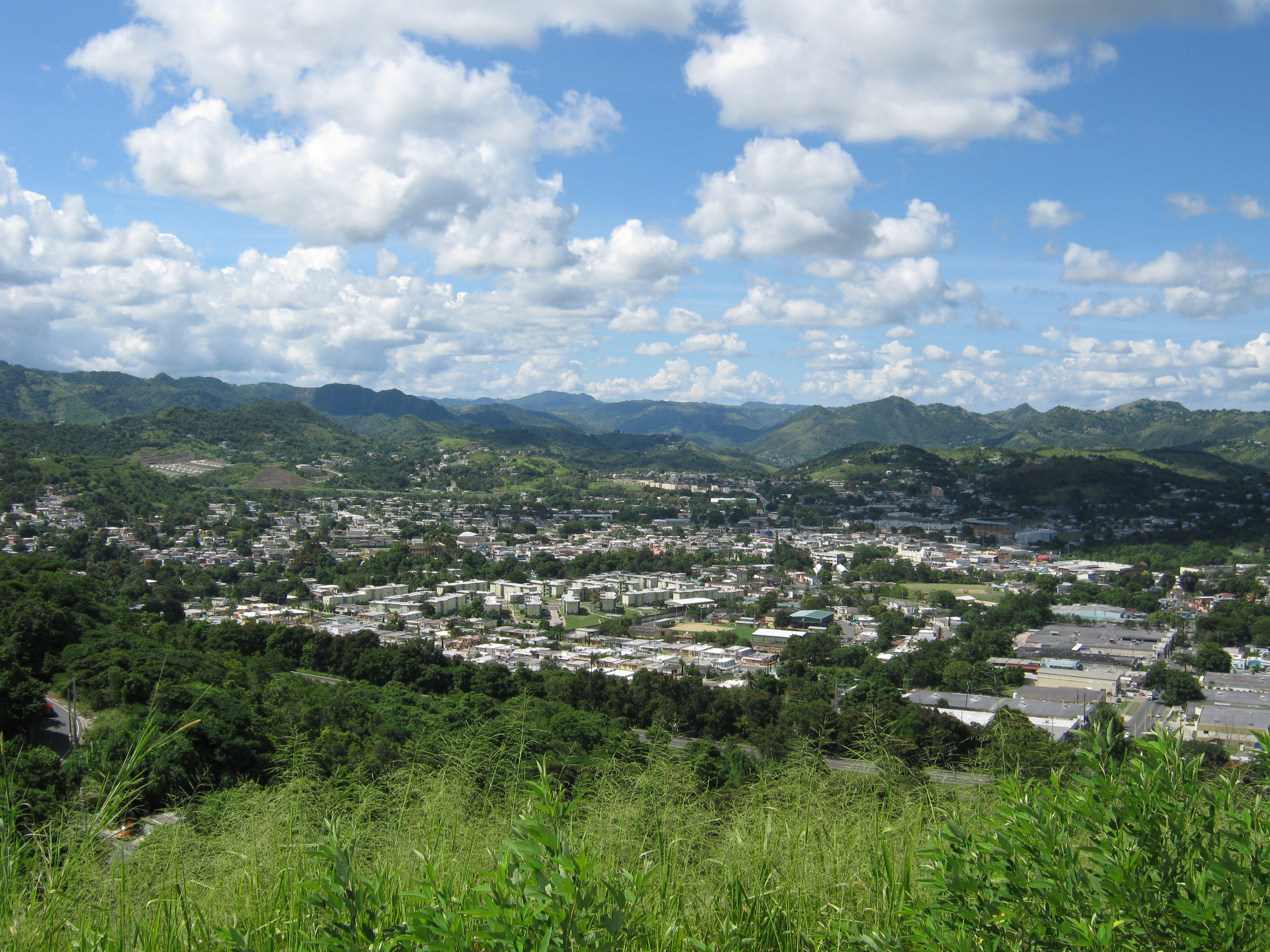
Cayey Pueblo from PR-52

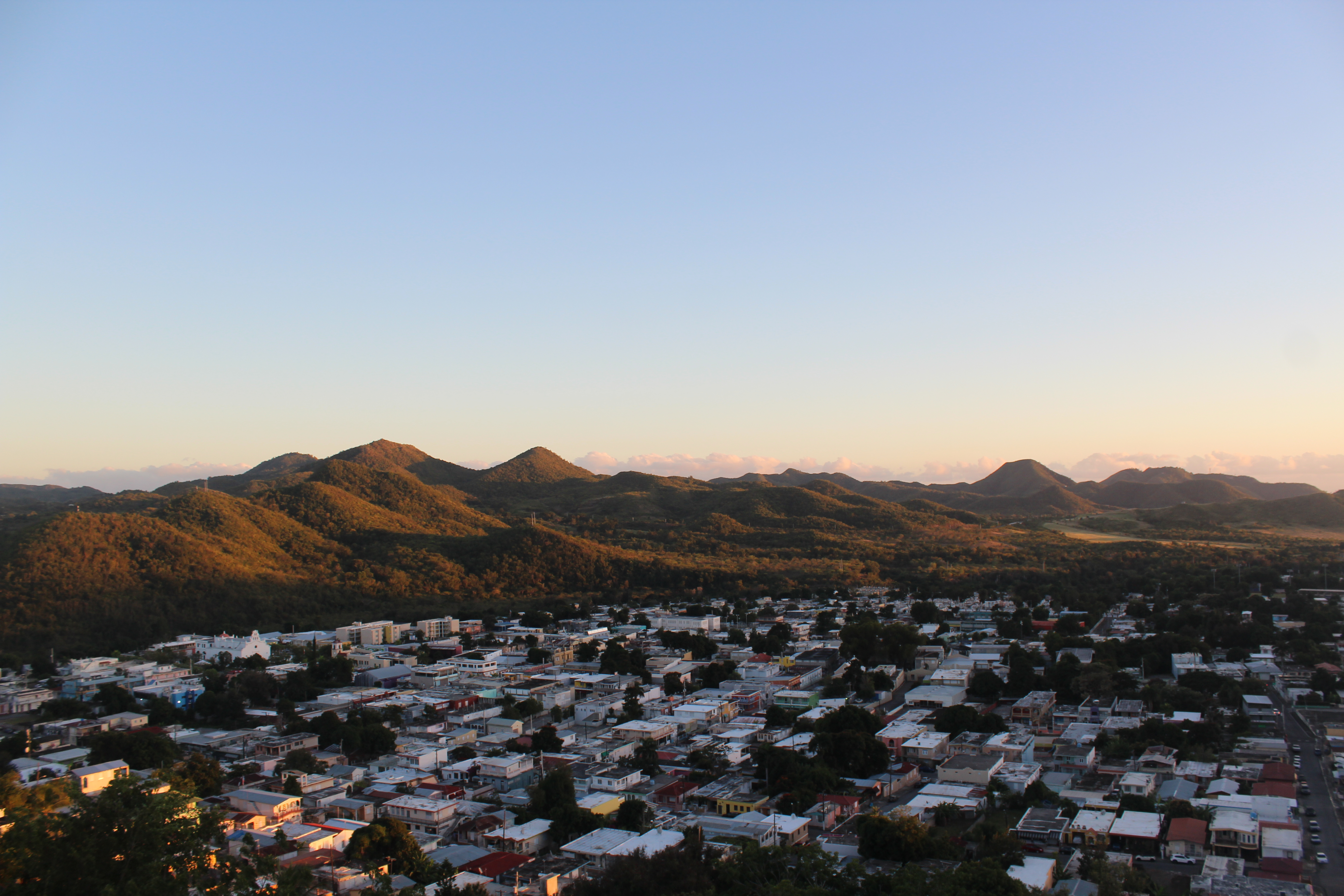
Coamo Pueblo, the third oldest settlement in Puerto Rico

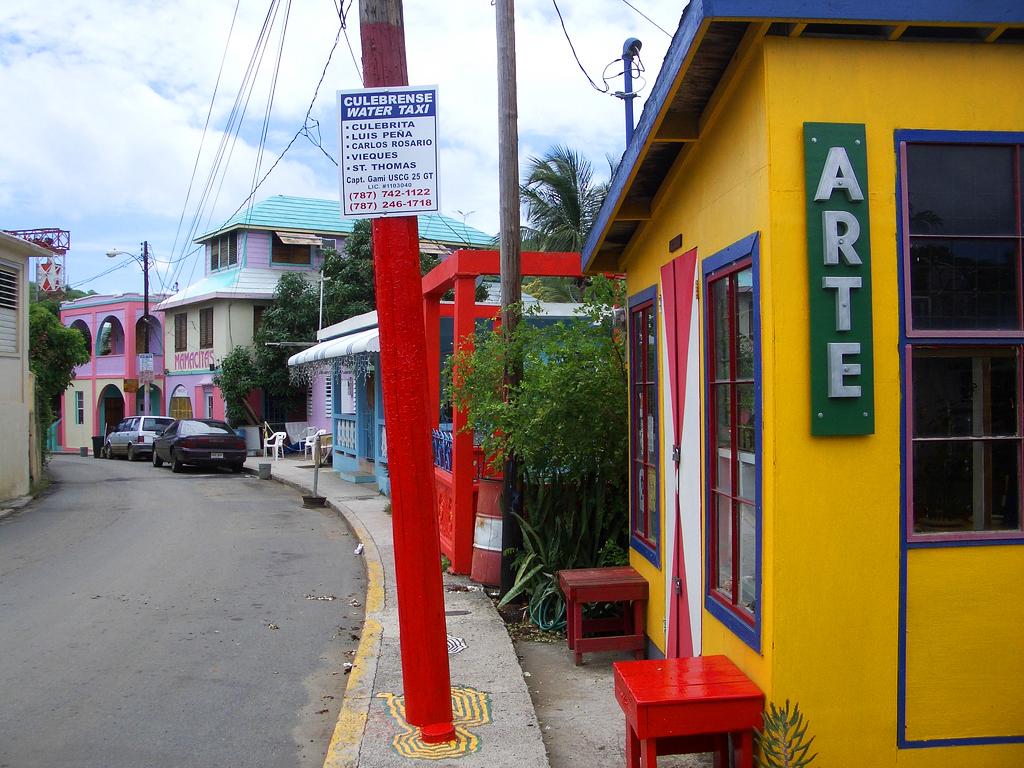
Typical street scene in Culebra Pueblo

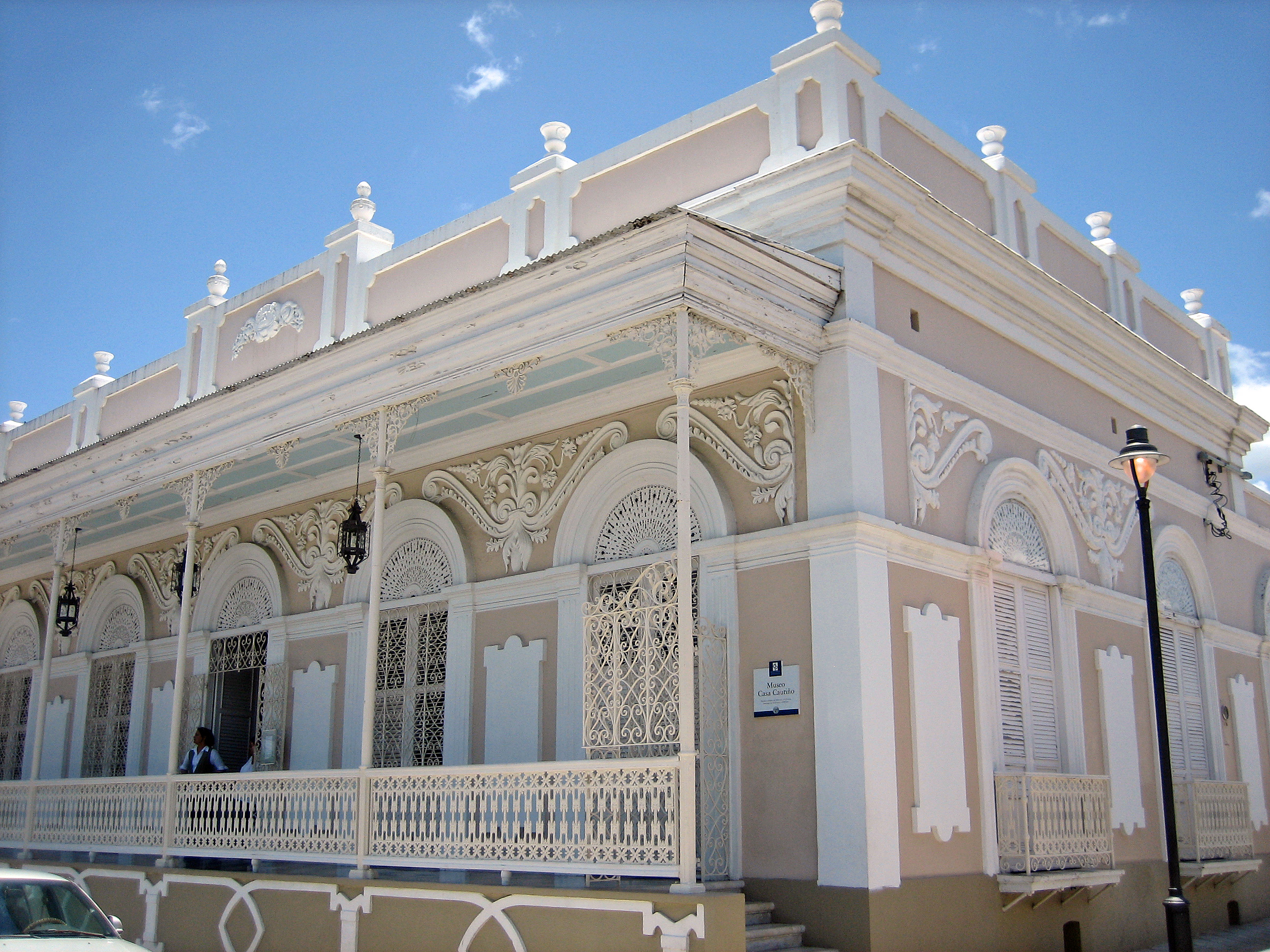
Casa Cautiño in Guayama Pueblo

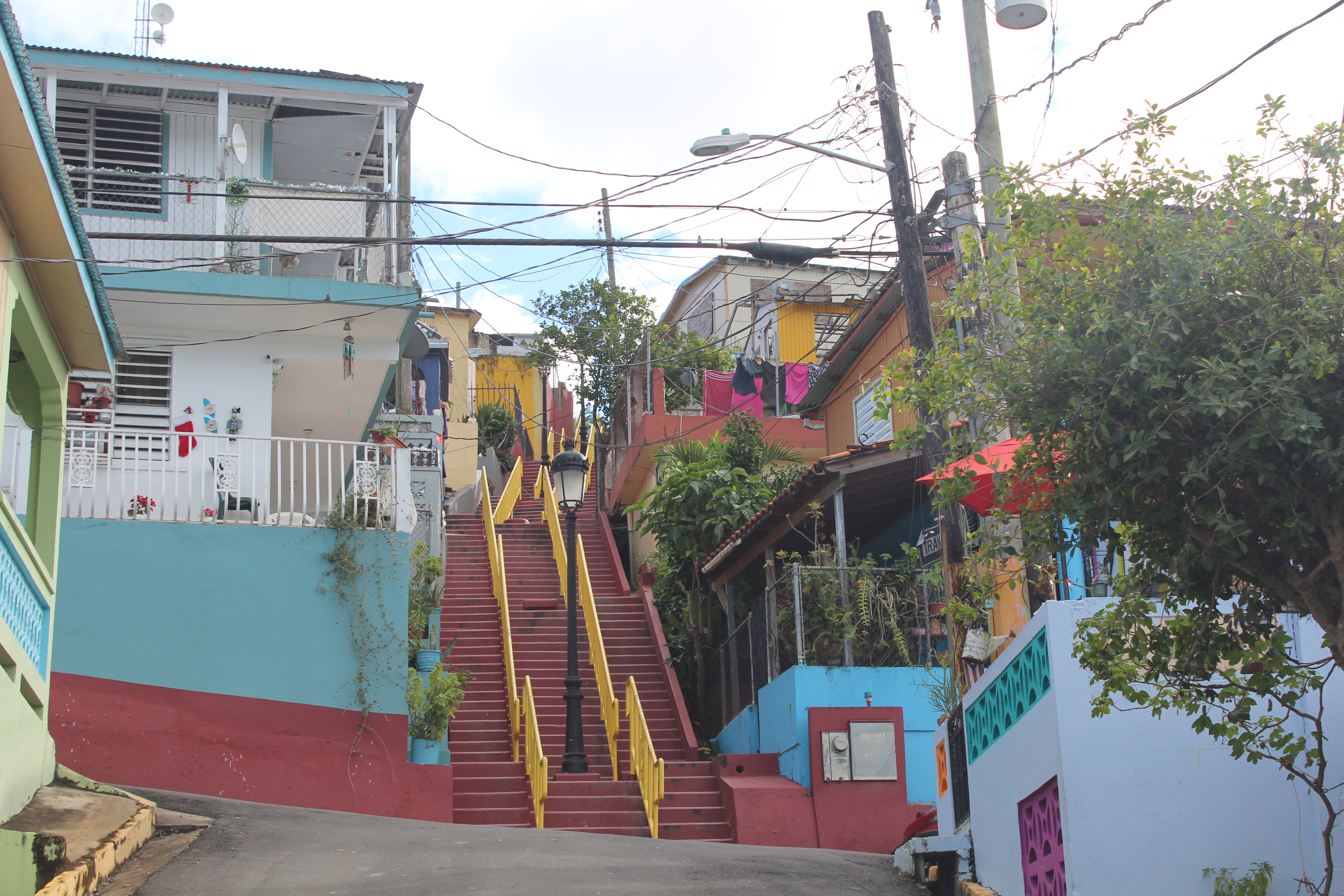
El Cerro step streets in Gurabo Pueblo

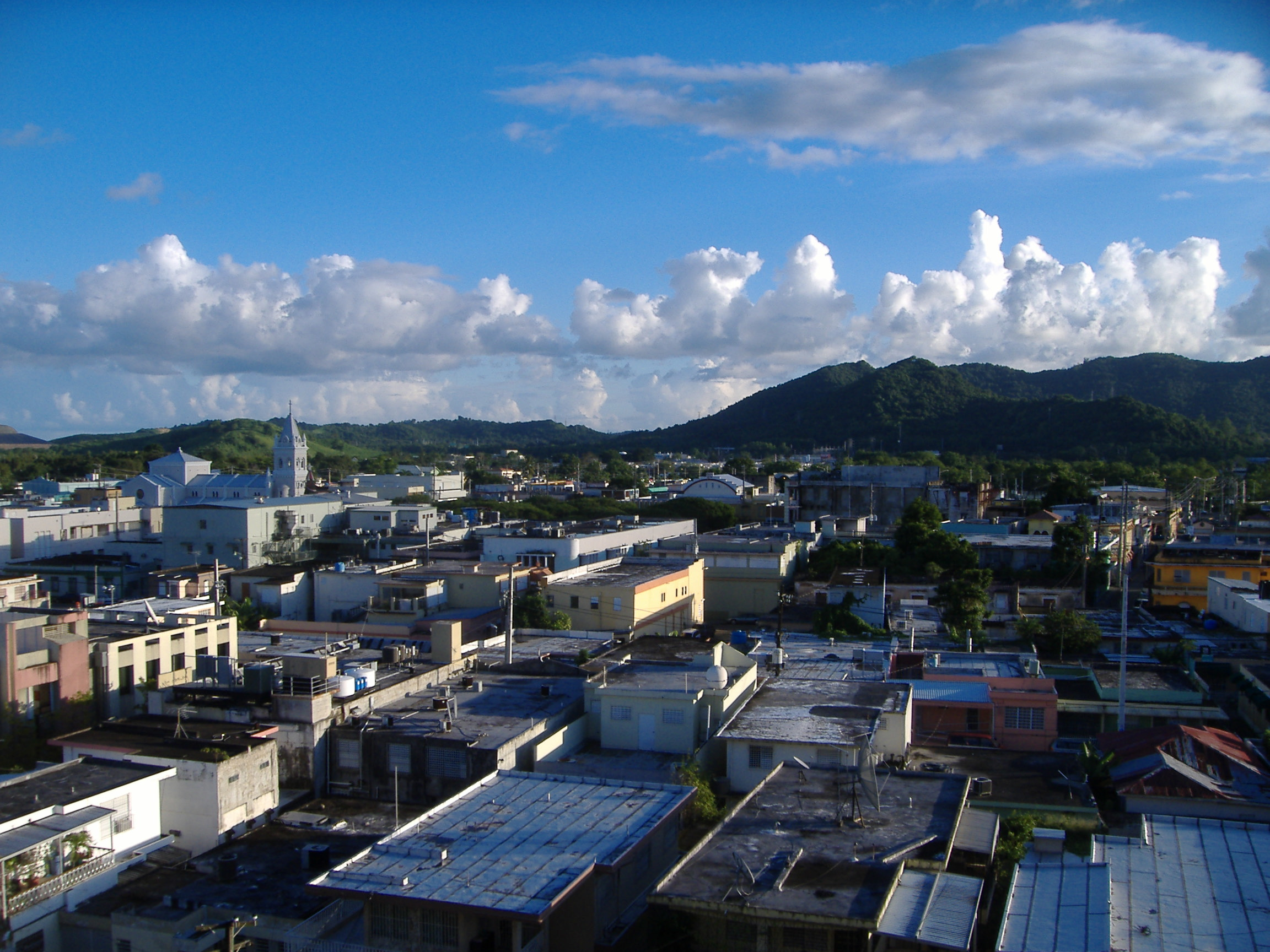
Humacao Pueblo skyline from the new city hall

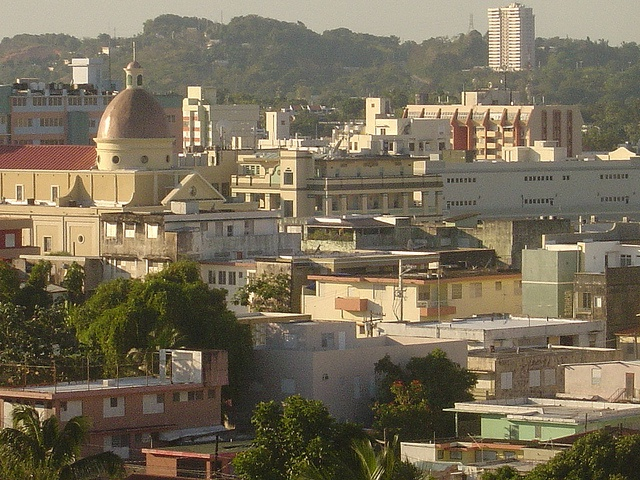
Mayagüez Pueblo

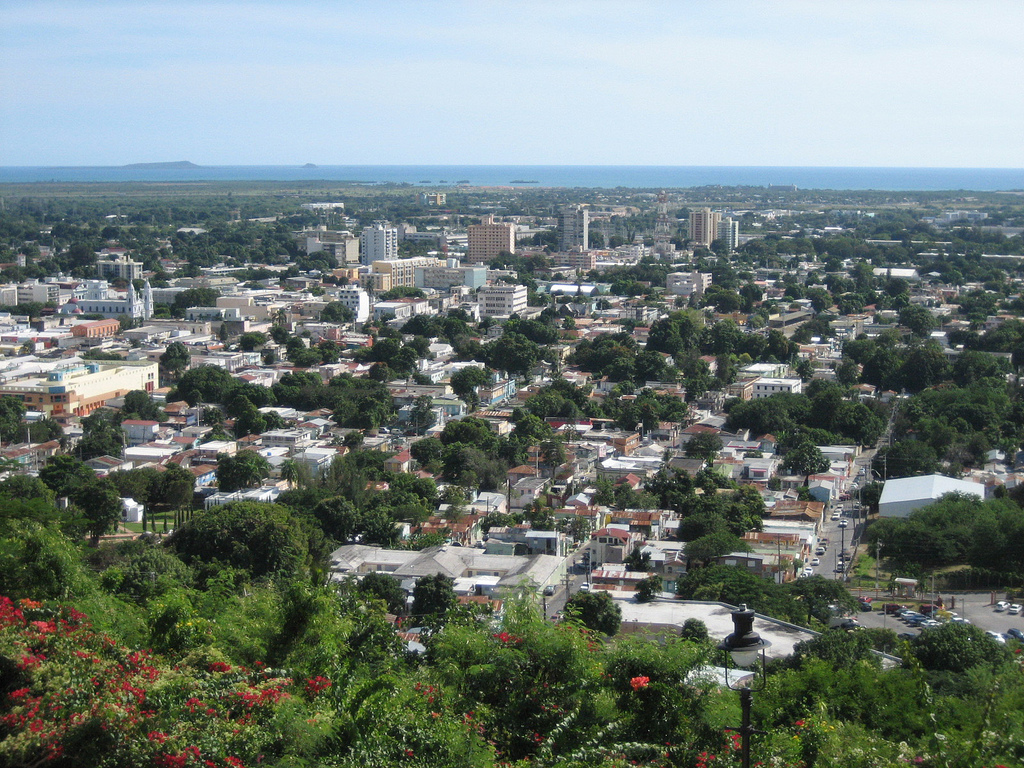
Ponce Pueblo from Cerro El Vigía

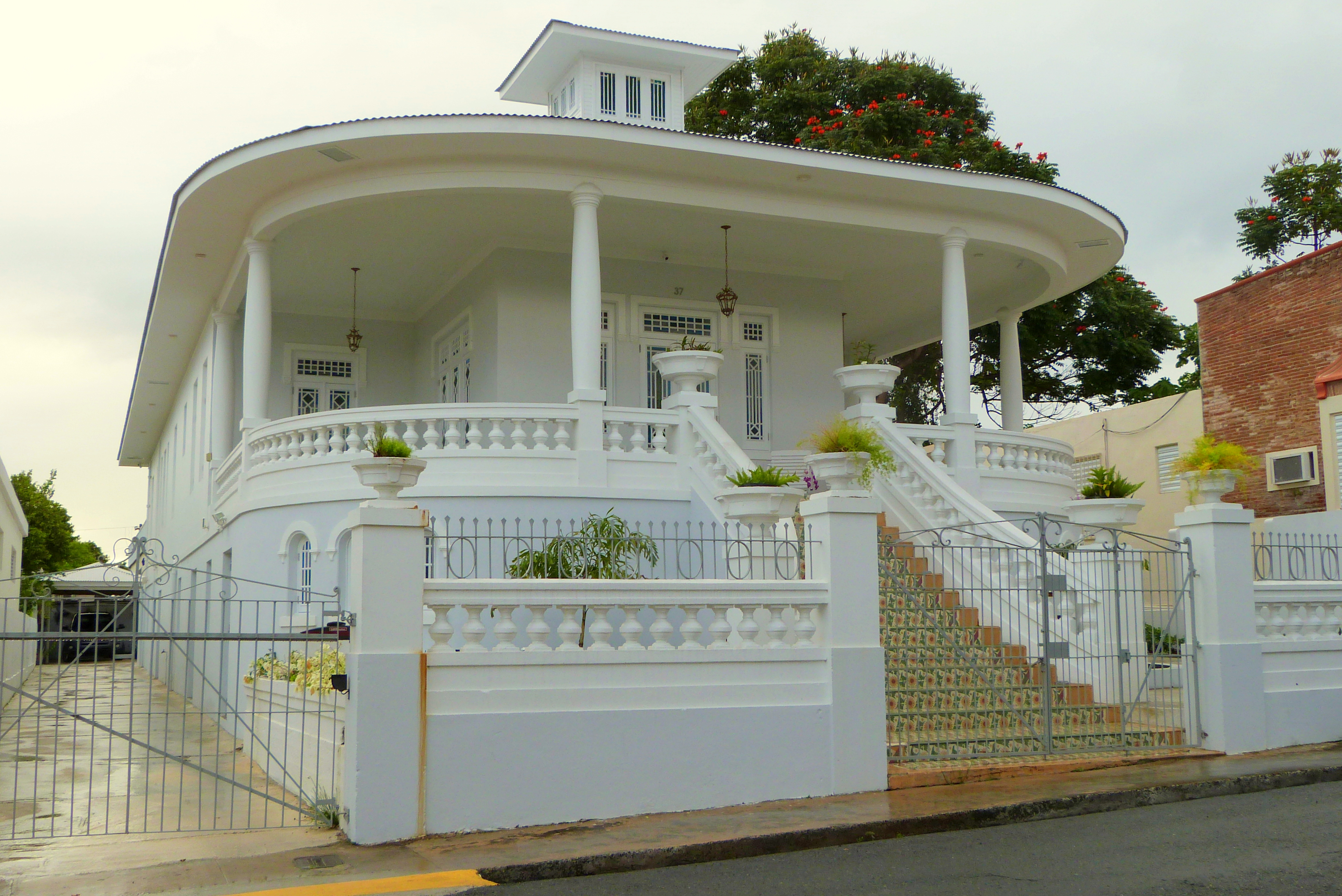
Historic house in Sabana Grande Pueblo

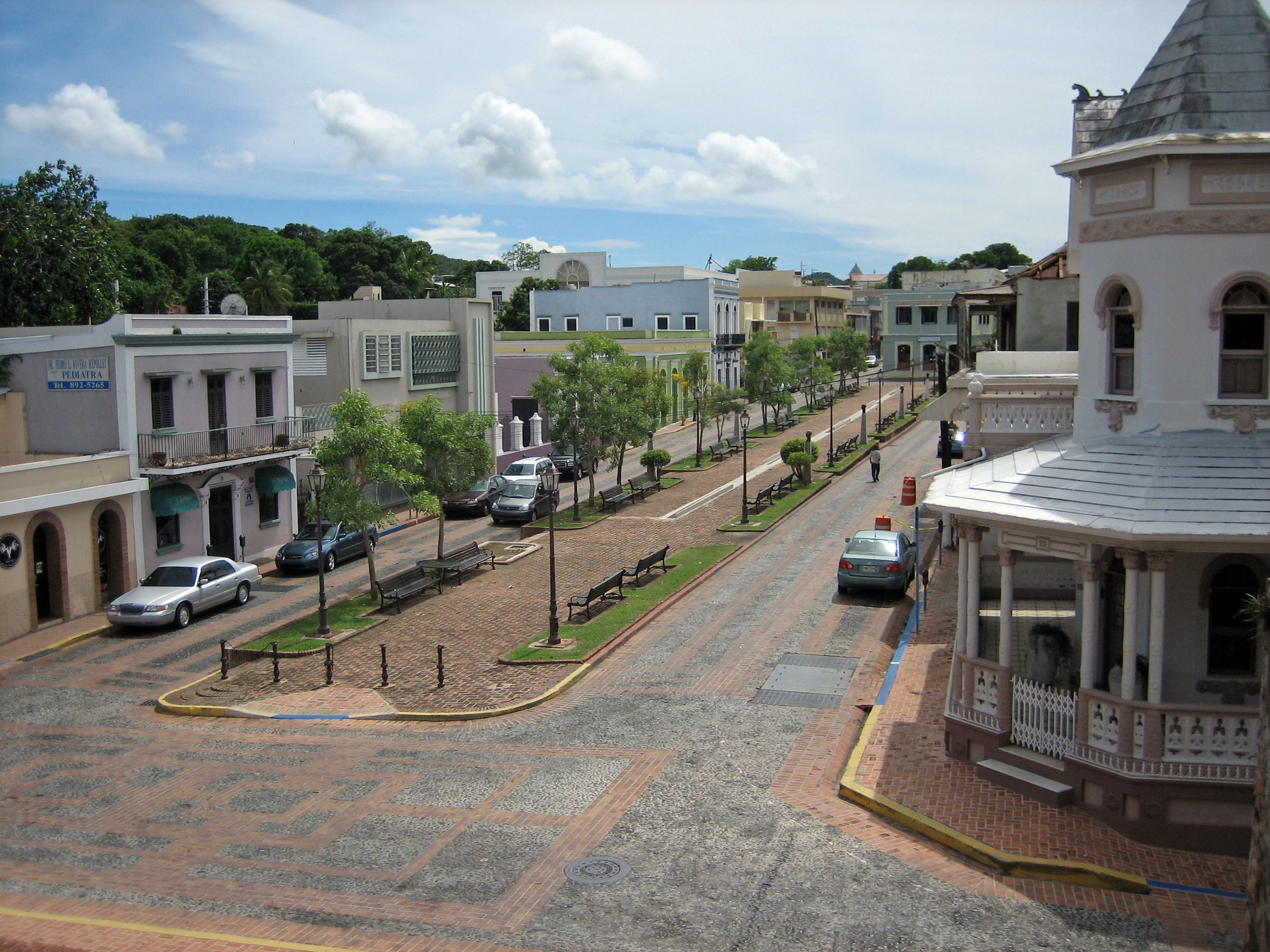
San Germán Pueblo

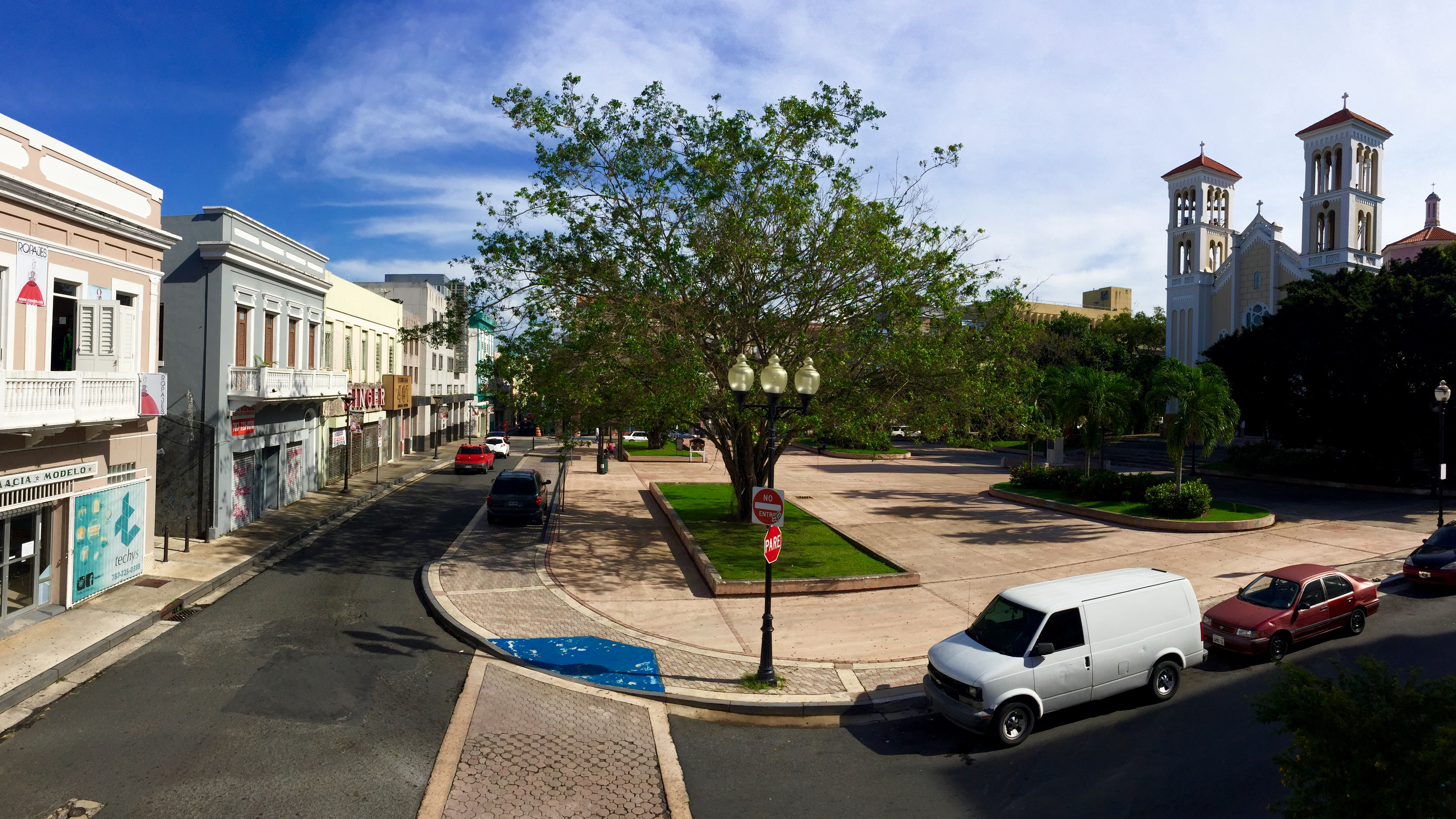
Río Piedras Pueblo; now part of San Juan

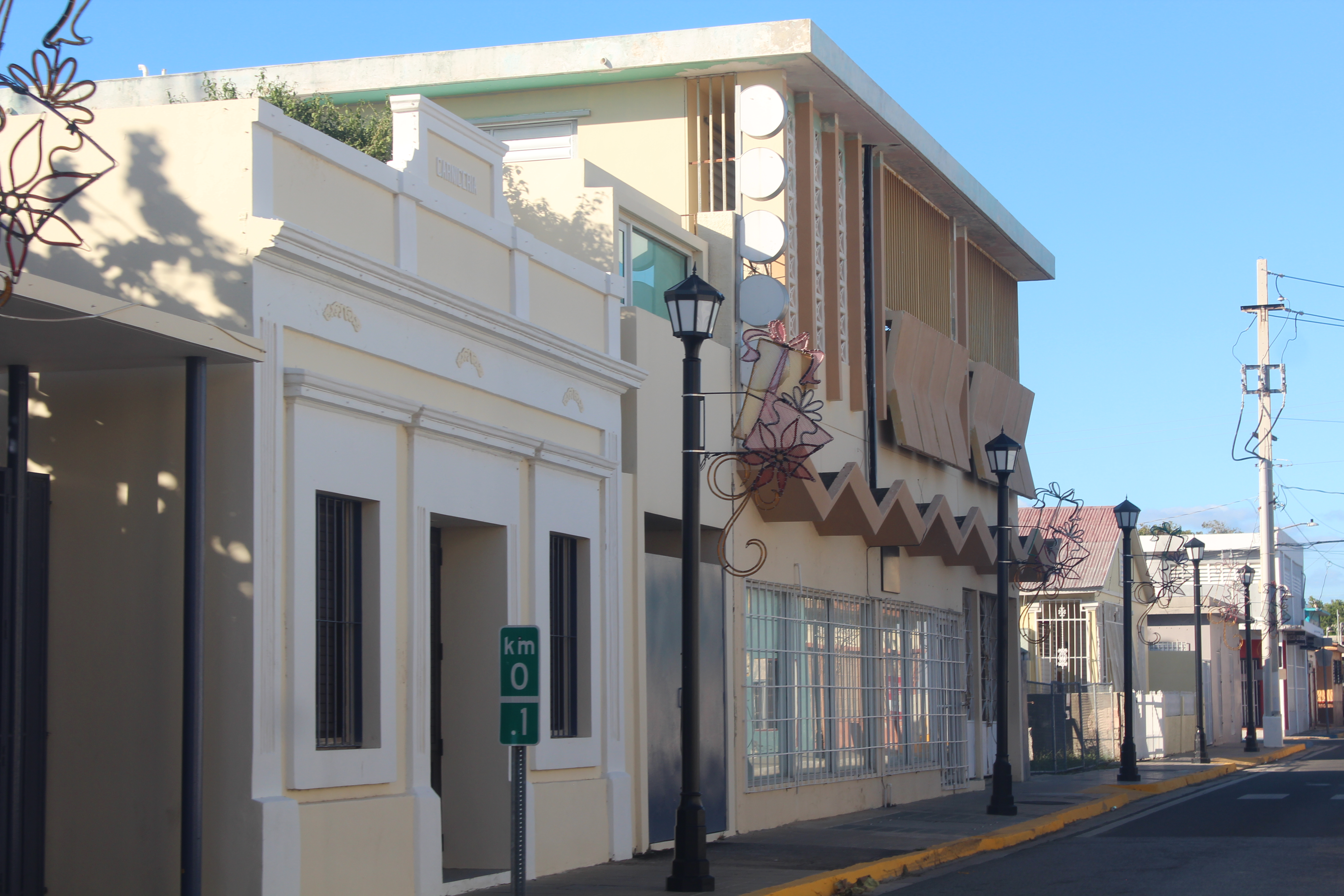
Eclectic architecture in Santa Isabel Pueblo

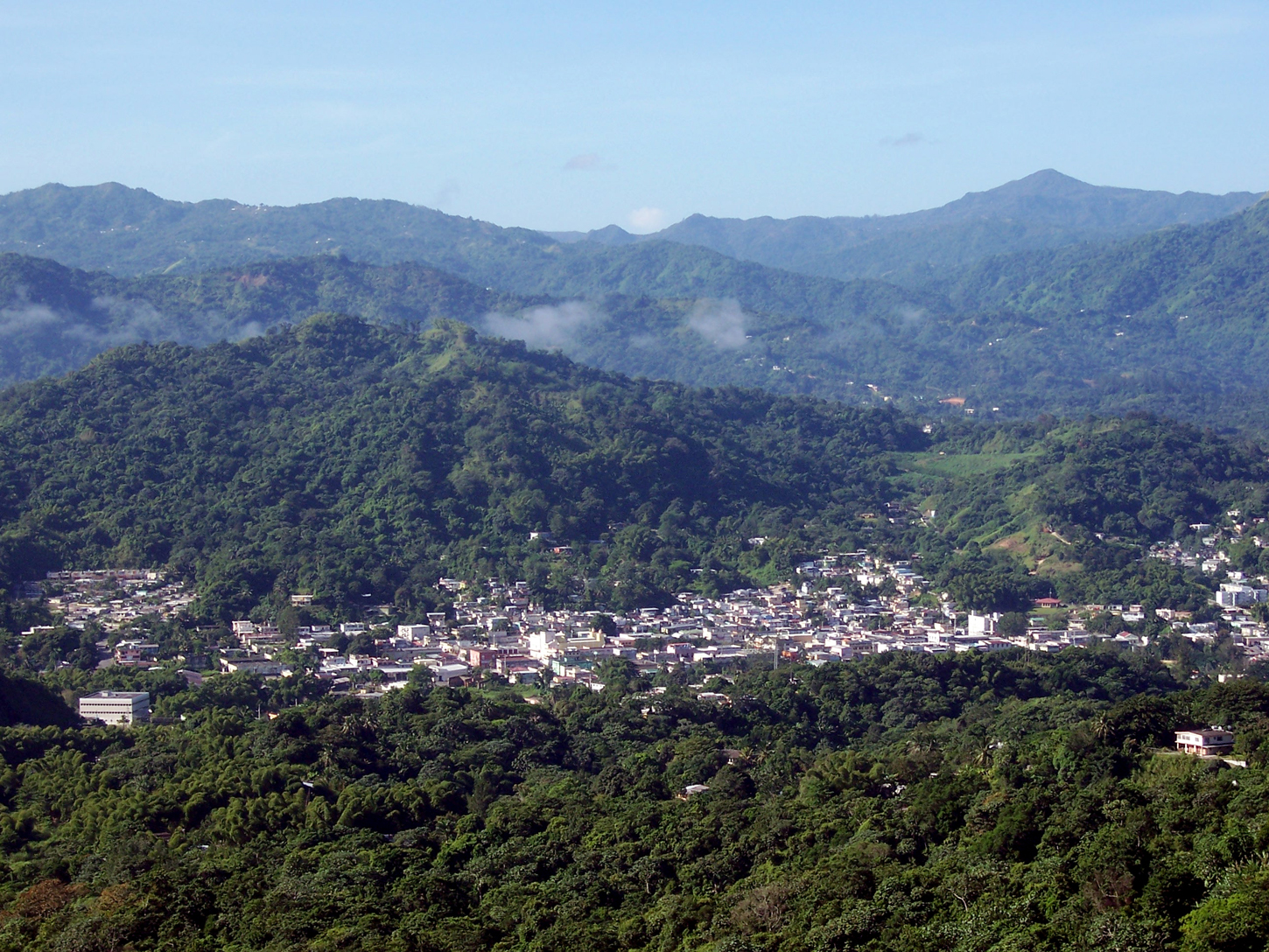
View of Utuado Pueblo

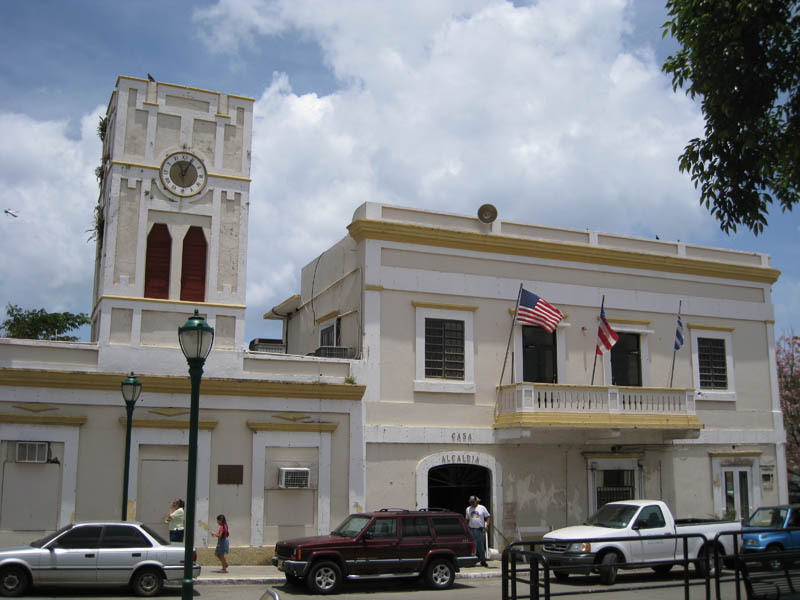
City hall of the island-municipality of Vieques at the Isabel II Pueblo

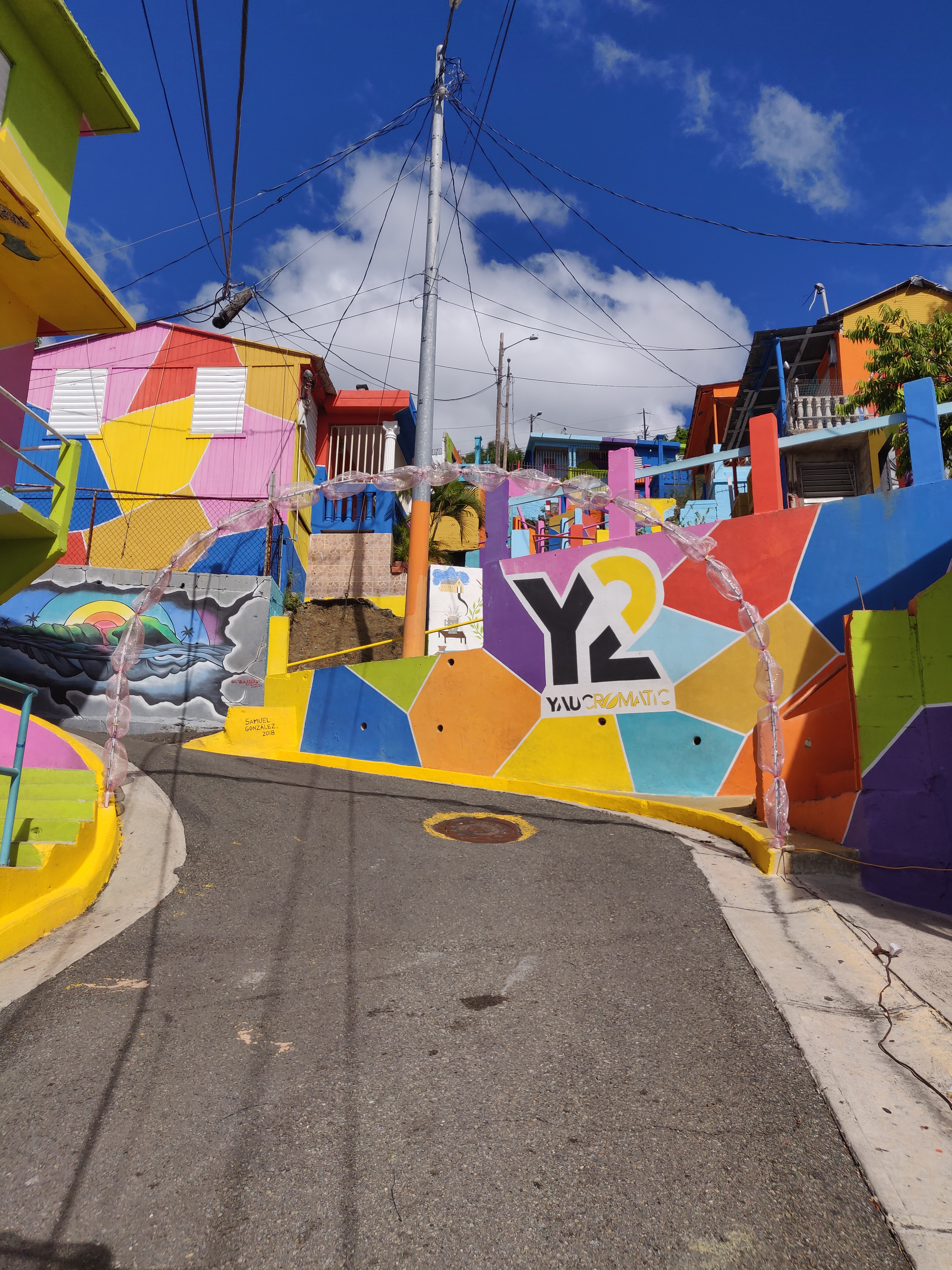
Public art at Yauco Pueblo

== See also ==
- Barrios of Puerto Rico
- Municipalities of Puerto Rico
