= Isabela barrio-pueblo =

Historical and administrative center (seat) of Isabela, Puerto Rico

Isabela barrio-pueblo Pueblo de Isabela
- Municipality Seat
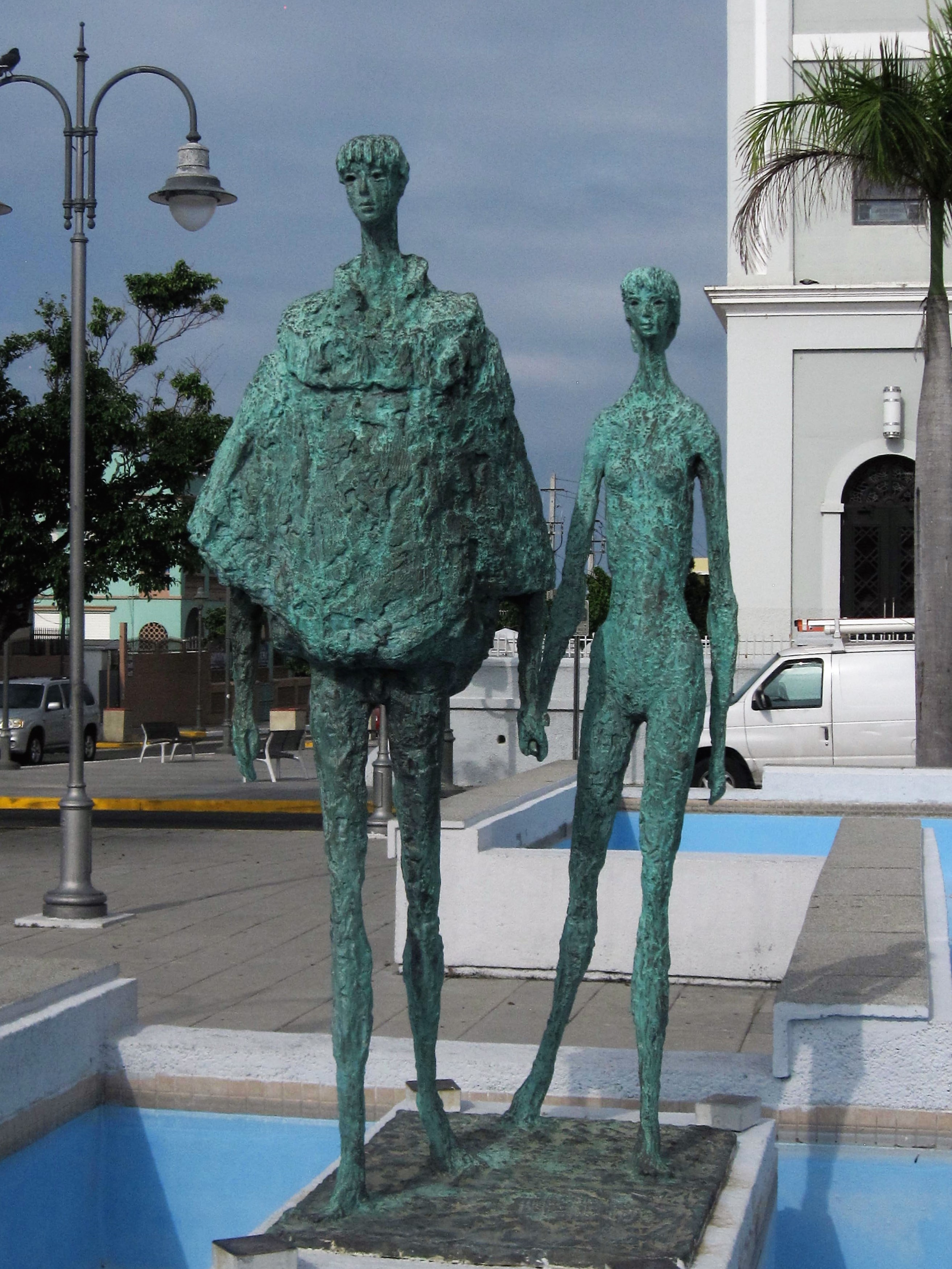
- Isabela barrio-pueblo, Puerto Rico

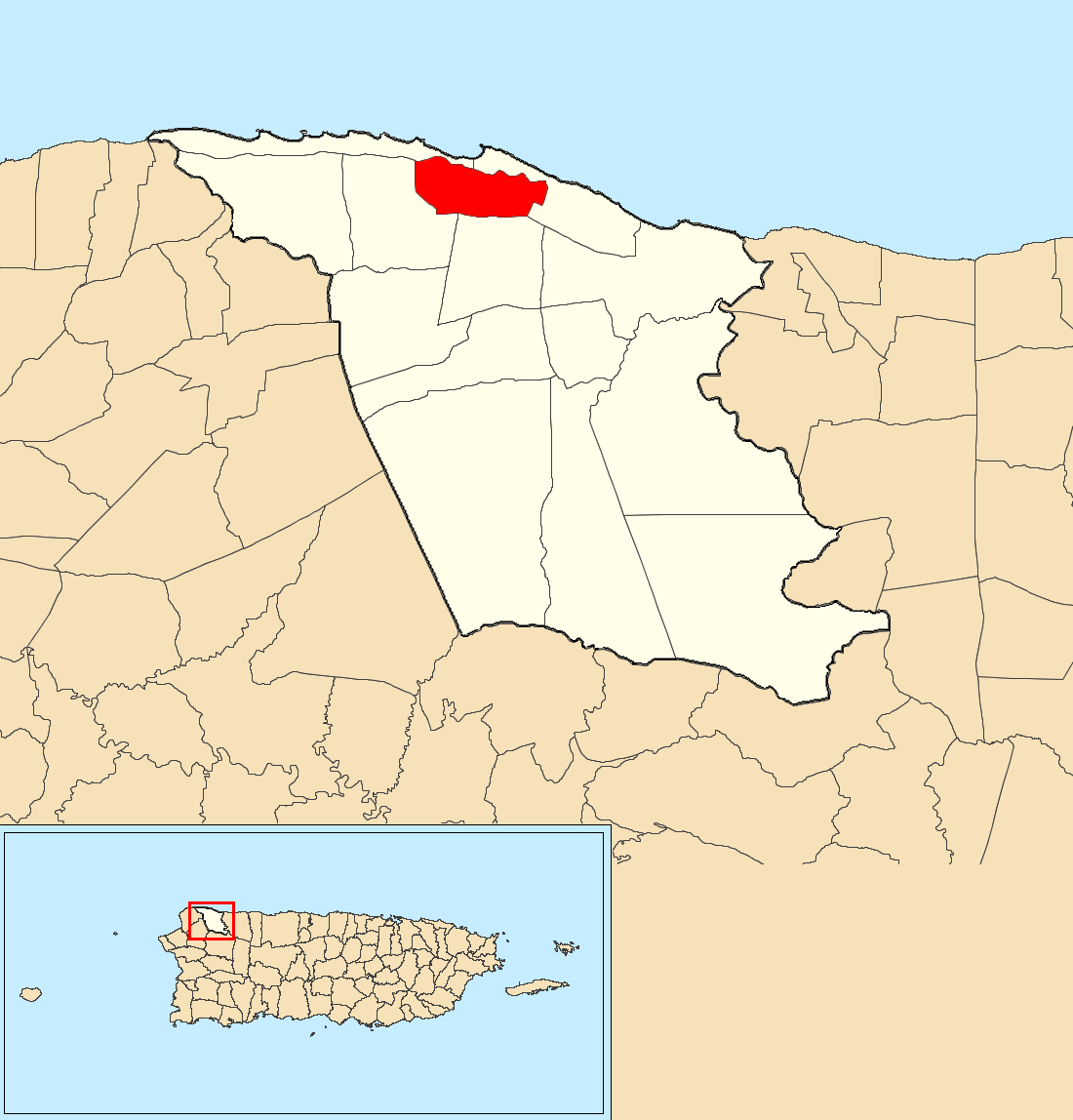
- Location of Isabela barrio-pueblo within the municipality of Isabela shown in red

- Location of Puerto Rico
- Coordinates: 18°30′03″N 67°01′23″W
- Commonwealth: Puerto Rico
- Municipality: Isabela

Area
  - Total: 1.46 sq mi (3.8 km^{2})
  - Land: 1.46 sq mi (3.8 km^{2})
  - Water: 0 sq mi (0 km^{2})
- Elevation: 233 ft (71 m)

Population (2010)
  - Total: 7,826
  - Density: 5,397.2/sq mi (2,083.9/km^{2})
- Source: 2010 Census
- Time zone: UTC−4 (AST)

Isabela barrio-pueblo is a barrio and the administrative center (seat) of Isabela, a municipality of Puerto Rico. Its population in 2010 was 7,826.

As was customary in Spain, in Puerto Rico, the municipality has a barrio called pueblo which contains a central plaza, the municipal buildings (city hall), and a Catholic church. Fiestas patronales (patron saint festivals) are held in the central plaza every year.

== The central plaza and its church ==
The central plaza, or square, is a place for official and unofficial recreational events and a place where people can gather and socialize from dusk to dawn. The Laws of the Indies, Spanish law, which regulated life in Puerto Rico in the early 19th century, stated the plaza's purpose was for "the parties" (celebrations, festivities) (Spanish: a propósito para las fiestas), and that the square should be proportionally large enough for the number of neighbors (Spanish: grandeza proporcionada al número de vecinos). These Spanish regulations also stated that the streets nearby should be comfortable portals for passersby, protecting them from the elements: sun and rain.

Located in Isabela barrio-pueblo is the Manuel Corchado y Juarb recreational plaza. Located across from the downtown central plaza is the Parroquia San Antonio de Padua (English: Anthony of Padua Roman Catholic parish church). The church was built between 1819 and 1824. It sustained damage during the 1918 San Fermín earthquake. The current church, which is made of reinforced concrete, was completed in 1924; and the last time it was renovated was in 1998.

== History ==
Isabela barrio-pueblo was in Spain's gazetteers until Puerto Rico was ceded by Spain in the aftermath of the Spanish–American War under the terms of the Treaty of Paris of 1898 and became an unincorporated territory of the United States. In 1899, the United States Department of War conducted a census of Puerto Rico finding that the population of Pueblo was 881.

Historical population
Census	Pop.	Note	%±
1900	881		—
1910	1,268		43.9%
1920	1,699		34.0%
1930	2,641		55.4%
1940	3,439		30.2%
1950	6,895		100.5%
1960	7,302		5.9%
1970	0		−100.0%
1980	8,968		—
1990	10,275		14.6%
2000	9,204		−10.4%
2010	7,826		−15.0%
U.S. Decennial Census; 1899 (shown as 1900) 1910-1930; 1930-1950 1980-2000 2010

== Gallery ==
Scenes around Isabela barrio-pueblo:

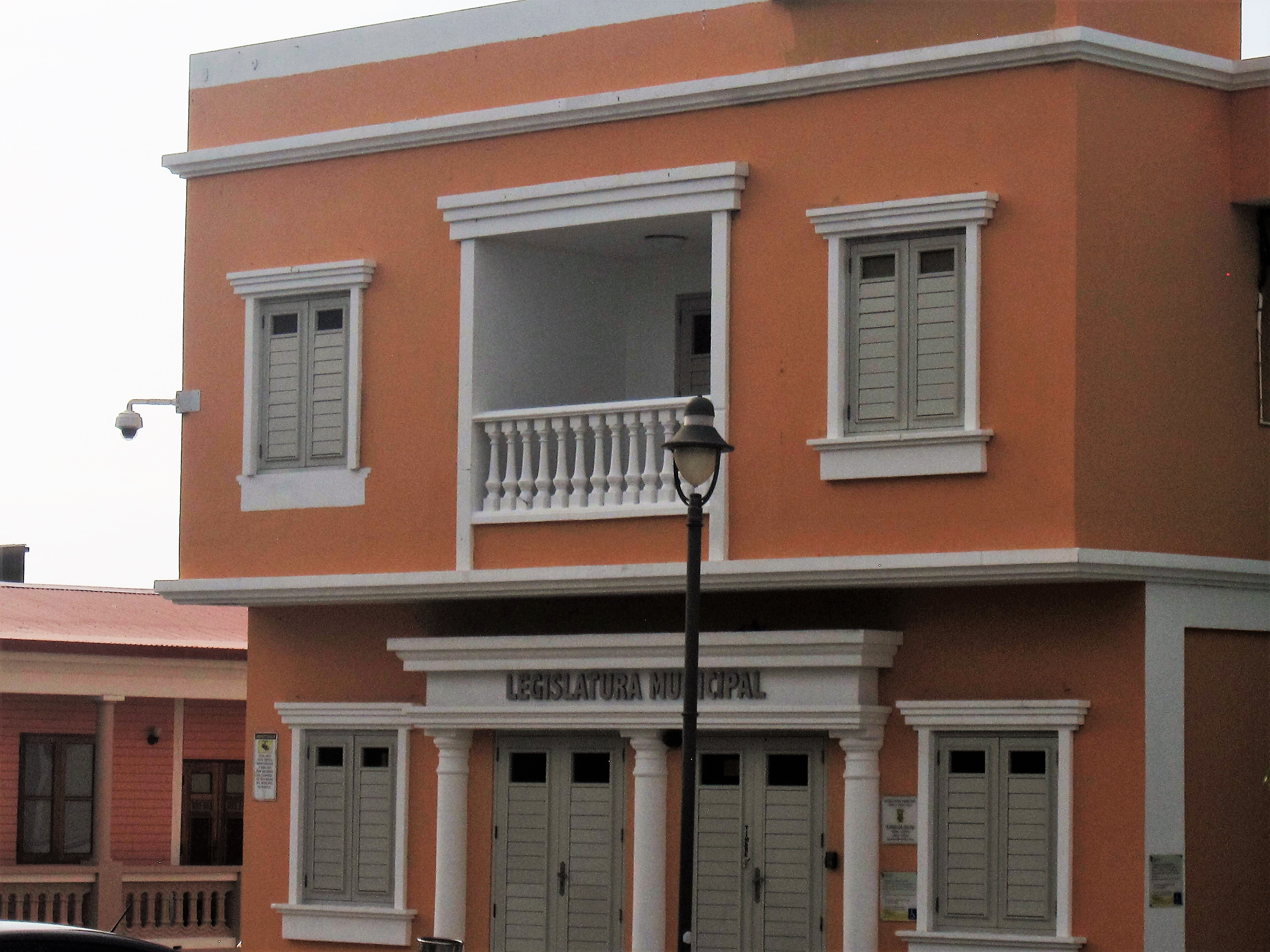
Government building

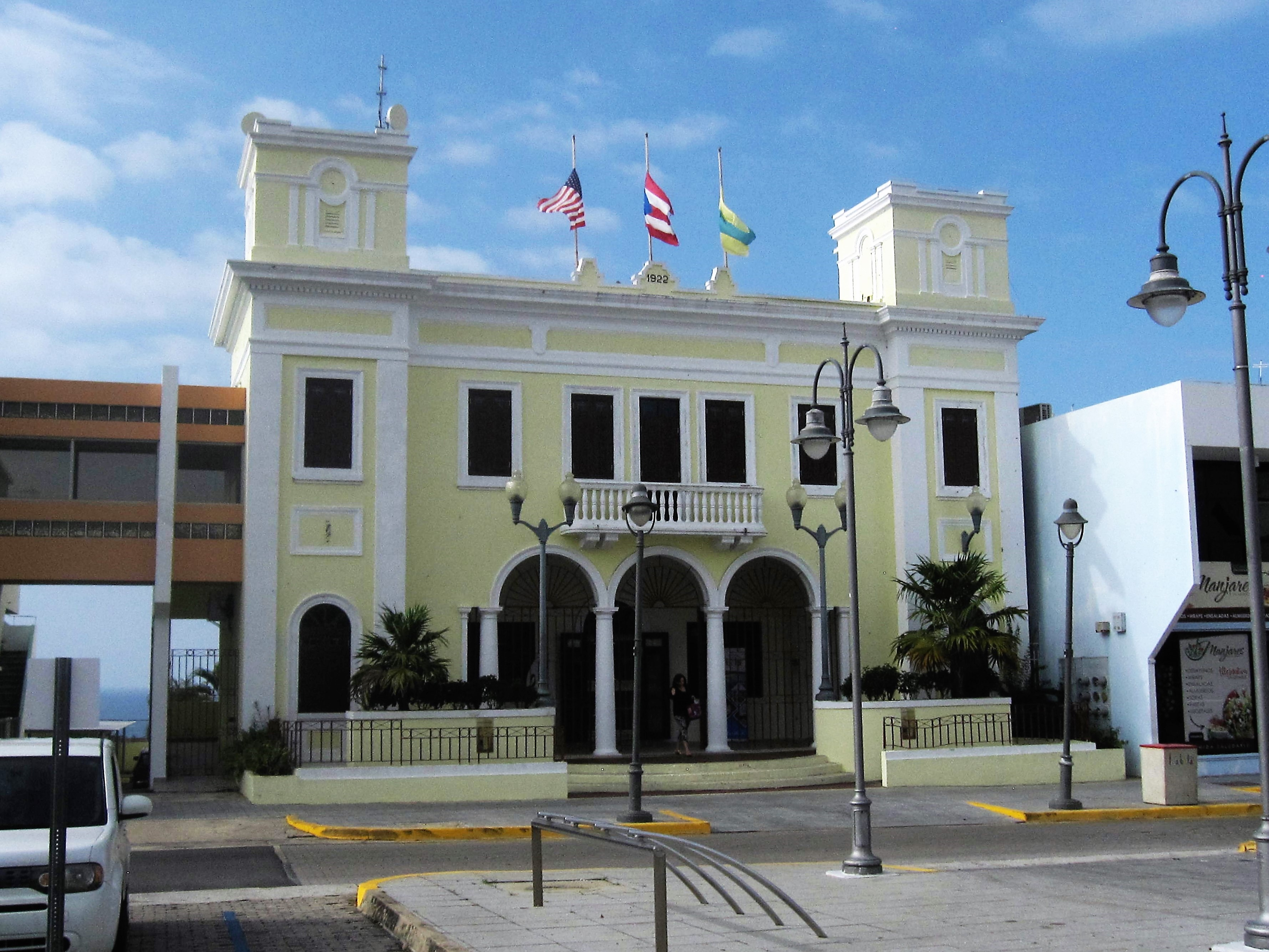
Government building

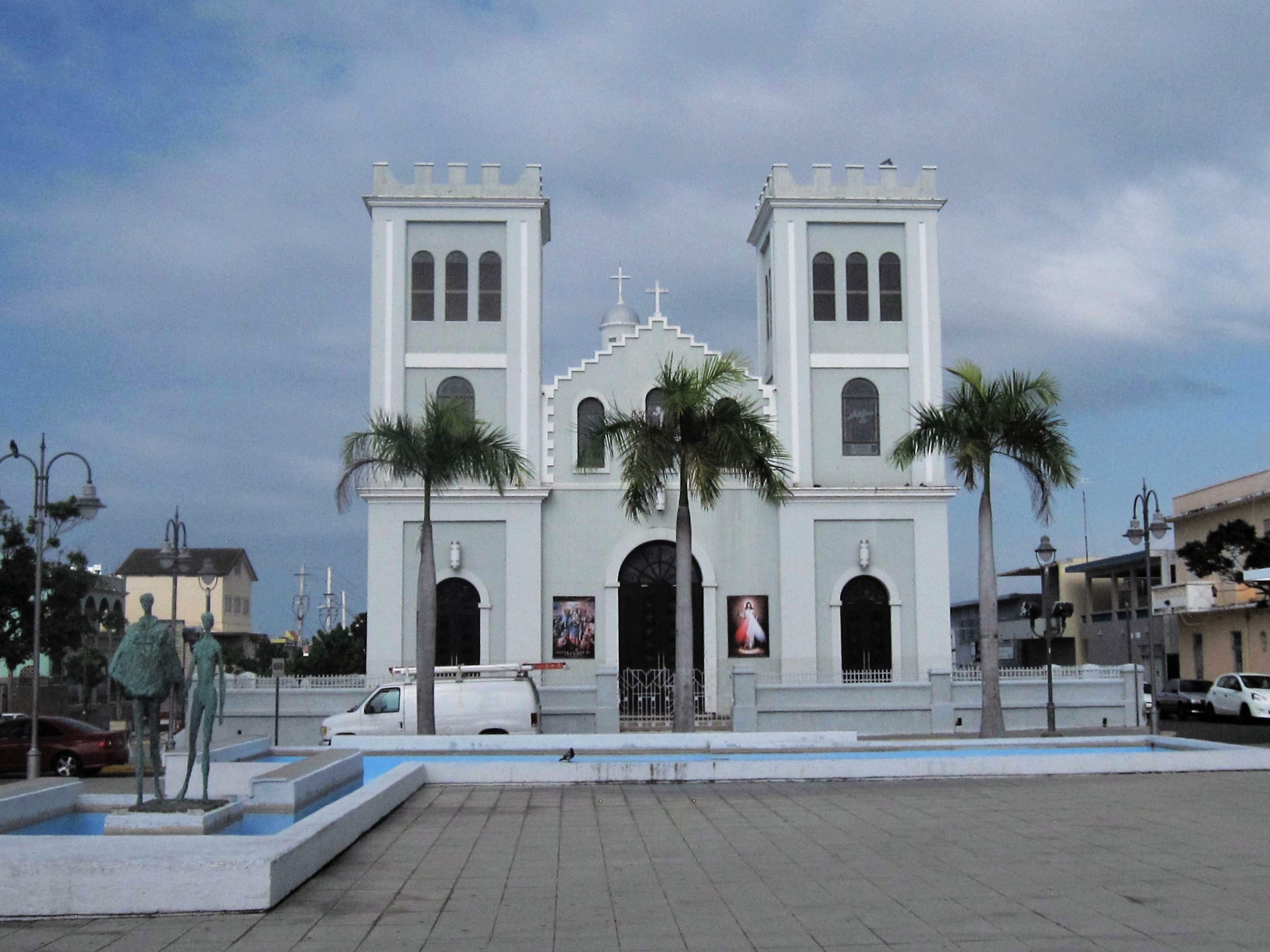
Roman Catholic Church and central plaza

== See also ==
- List of communities in Puerto Rico
