= El Cerro (Gurabo, Puerto Rico) =

Sector of Gurabo barrio-pueblo in Puerto Rico

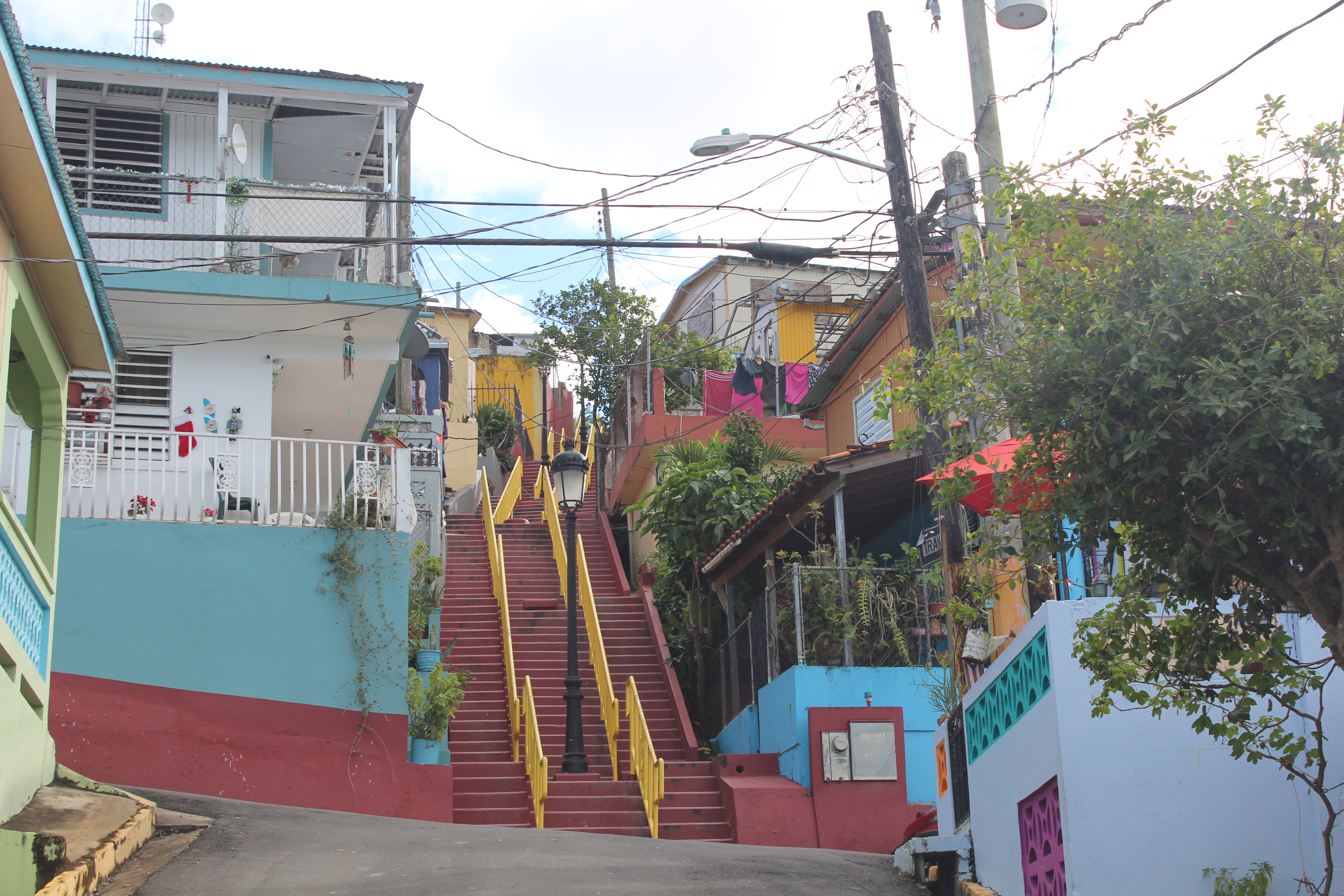
Step street in El Cerro.

El Cerro (Spanish for "the hill") is a residential district or sector of the barrio Gurabo Pueblo (downtown Gurabo), in the municipality of Gurabo, Puerto Rico. The district is located on a steep hill just south of the main town square of Gurabo. One of the most distinctive features of El Cerro are its step streets, pedestrian streets that consists of colorfully painted stairs. These step streets give Gurabo one of its nicknames Pueblo de las Escaleras ("town of the stairs"). El Cerro contains 5 step streets: Zoilo Rivera Morales Street (136 steps), Zenón Vázquez Street (136 steps), Matías González García Street (119 steps), Santiago Street (57 steps), and Este Street (59 steps).

== See also ==
- List of communities in Puerto Rico
- List of barrios and sectors of Gurabo, Puerto Rico
