= Church San José of Gurabo =

Historic church in Puerto Rico

- U.S. National Register of Historic Places
- Puerto Rico Historic Sites and Zones
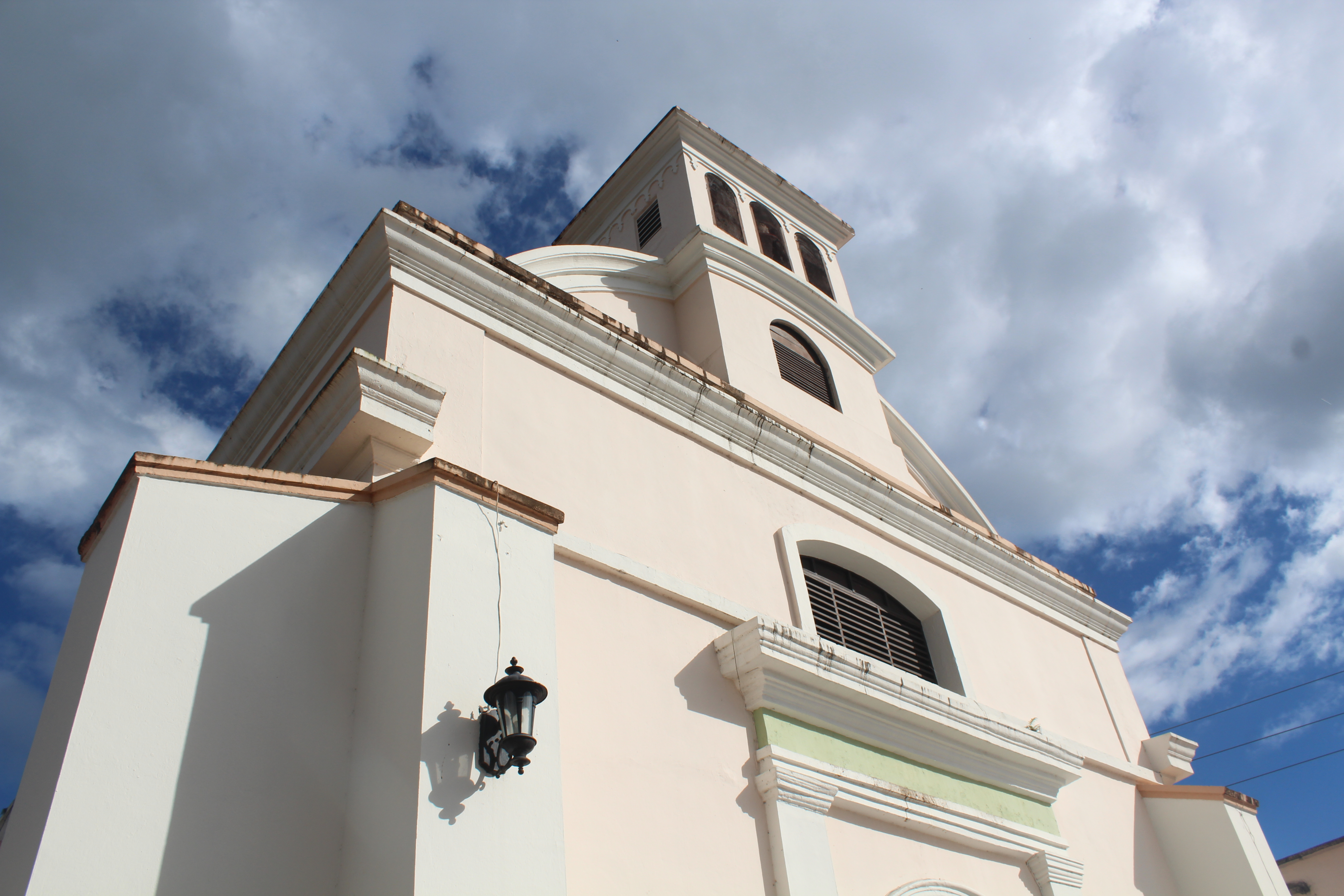
- San José of Gurabo Parish Church

- Location within Puerto Rico
- Location: Santiago and Eugenio Sánches López Streets on the main town square of Gurabo
- Coordinates: 18°15′18″N 65°58′21″W
- Built: 1821
- NRHP reference No.: 84003142
- RNSZH No.: 2000-(RCE)-21-JP-SH

Significant dates
- Added to NRHP: September 18, 1984
- Designated RNSZH: December 21, 2000

The Church San José of Gurabo (Spanish: Iglesia San José de Gurabo) is a historic Catholic parish church located in Gurabo Pueblo (downtown Gurabo) in the municipality of Gurabo, Puerto Rico. The parish church is part of the Roman Catholic Diocese of Caguas.

The current church structure dates to 1821, and it was erected 6 years after the official founding of the municipality of Gurabo. The church was added to the National Register of Historic Places on September 18, 1984, and to the Puerto Rico Register of Historic Sites and Zones in 2000.
