= Step street =

Type of pedestrian street

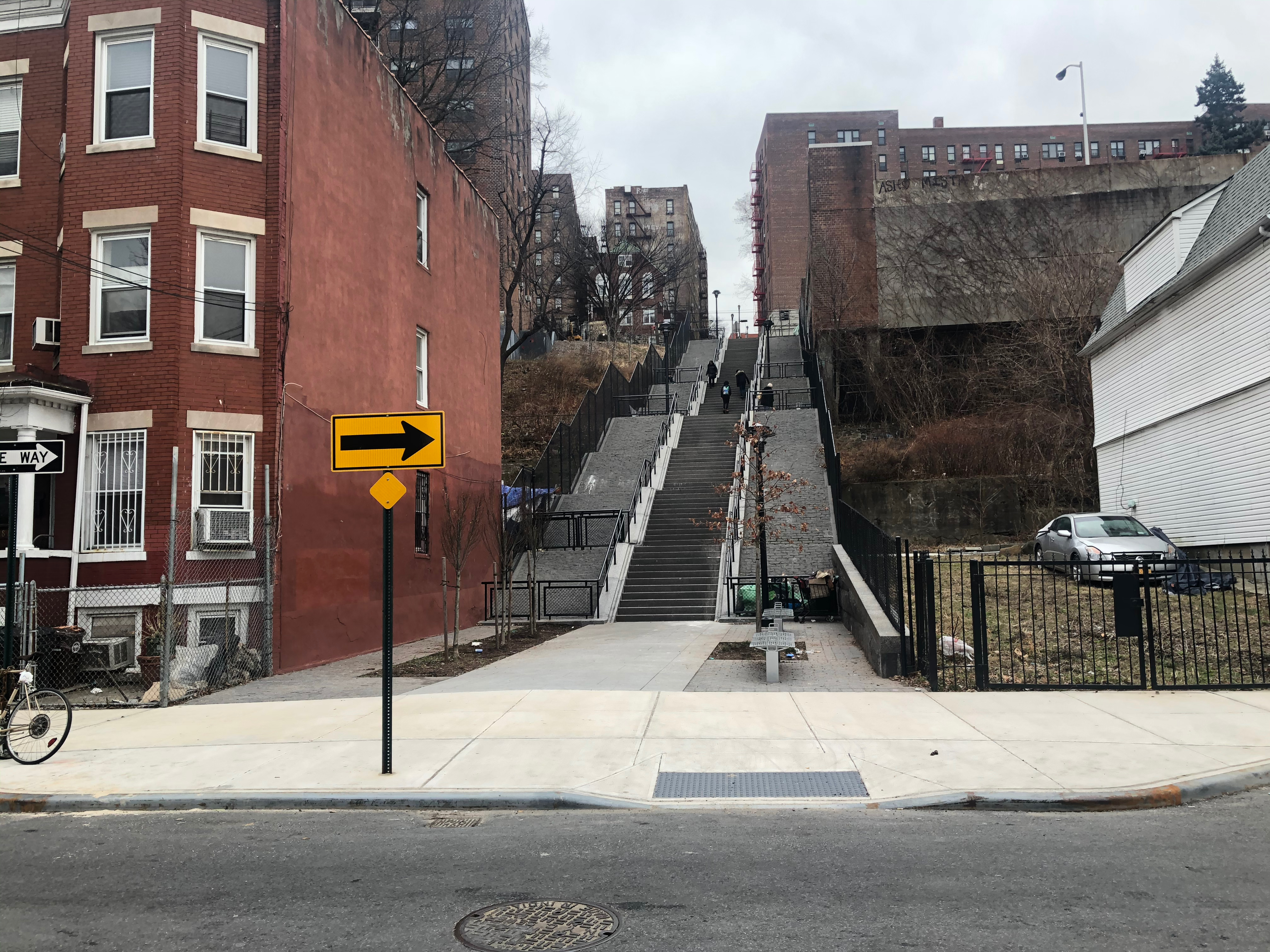
Step street at West 229th Street, Bronx, New York

A step street is a thoroughfare fitted with steps for pedestrian traffic rather than paved or tracked for motor vehicles. It is a practical way of providing access up and down a slope that is too steep for automobiles. Step streets consist of a staircase of stone or concrete steps, often with a handrail on posts down the center, and sometimes lined with trees. Examples can be found in hilly urban areas.

Step streets fell out of popularity with urban designers as the use of the automobile increased in cities, and some step streets have been removed and redesigned as graded walkways to address accessibility concerns and to allow other wheeled transport such as bicycles, strollers, and wheeled shopping baskets.

In the early 2010s, efforts were made to restore some of these open-air staircases in New York City.

== Examples ==
- In New York City, there are 102 step streets across the city's five boroughs. Of these, the majority (64) are in the Bronx. Others are scattered through hilly areas of Upper Manhattan, Queens, Brooklyn, and Staten Island. Some of the more notable step streets in New York City include Bushman Steps, which led to the Polo Grounds stadium in Upper Manhattan, as well as the Joker Stairs in the Bronx, one of the filming locations for the 2019 movie Joker.
- The city of Pittsburgh maintains over 700 sets of steps, some of which are classified as streets as part of a traditional street grid and often mapped as such with a disclaimer for drivers.
- Rue Foyatier in Montmartre, Paris, is said to be the most photographed staircase in Paris, with over 250 steps.
- There are also several step streets in San Francisco, California. One of these is the Lyon Street Steps between Broadway and Green Street in Pacific Heights, with 332 steps. Another, the Filbert Street Steps, descend the east slope of Telegraph Hill and run through the Grace Marchant Garden, tended by the residents who live along these steps. In total, there are 600 public stairs in San Francisco, not all of which are step streets.
- The town of Gurabo, Puerto Rico, is popularly known as Pueblo de las Escaleras ("town of the stairs") due to the number of step streets in the district of El Cerro near the center of town.
- In Montreal, Rue Saint-Christophe contains both stairs and a small slide, and is part of Parc Simonne-Monet-Chartrand.

== See also ==
- Ladder streets
- Perron (staircase)
