= Daughters of Mary, Mother of Our Savior =

Traditionalist Catholic congregation in the US

Congregation of the Daughters of Mary, Mother of Our Savior
- Formation: 1984; 42 years ago
- Founder: Rev. Clarence Kelly
- Founded at: Round Top, New York
- Type: Semi-contemplative; Catholic religious congregation; Traditionalist Catholicism
- Headquarters: St. Joseph's Novitiate
- Location: Round Top, New York, United States
- Members: 89 (2019)
- Website: www.daughtersofmary.net

The Daughters of Mary, Mother of Our Savior are a traditionalist Catholic congregation of religious sisters, founded in 1984 by the priest Clarence Kelly. Their convents and missions are not recognized by the Vatican or the local Catholic archdioceses where they operate; however, the congregation still refers to itself as Catholic.

The congregation and motherhouse are based out of St. Joseph's Novitiate in Round Top, New York, with additional convents in Melville, New York, and White Bear Lake, Minnesota. As traditionalist Catholics, the congregation does not adhere to the modern practices of the Second Vatican Council. They are closely associated with the Society of Saint Pius V, a society of priests which still perform traditional Tridentine Mass, also co-founded by Kelly. Outside of their convents, the congregation maintains a network of missions, including schools and churches, which promote Traditionalist Catholicism. They also have released music albums of traditional Catholic music and Gregorian chants.

The congregation has received mixed reception in the commentary made about them, with positive feedback from their administration of the St. Anne's Chapel and Academy location, and negative feedback from the perception of the group by some as a cult, a characterization they firmly deny despite some evidence showing otherwise. The congregation has also been the subject of news coverage for a 1988 alleged kidnapping case, in which a sister was taken from a convent by her family, and for a 2009 fraud lawsuit they filed over the sale of a valuable artwork. The lawsuit was later lost, leaving the congregation to pay damages for defamation.

== Structure ==
The Daughters of Mary are a semi-contemplative congregation which practices traditionalist Catholicism according to the practices of the Catholic Church before the Second Vatican Council (Vatican II) in 1962. They were founded by the traditionalist Catholic priest Clarence Kelly, who did not have the canonical authority to establish a religious congregation. As such, the congregation has no canonical status in the Catholic Church, and is not recognized by the Vatican or their local archdioceses. Nonetheless, the congregation refers to itself as Catholic.

They are closely associated with the Society of Saint Pius V, a group of priests who still perform traditional Tridentine Mass. This society of priests was led by Clarence Kelly, the same person who founded the congregation. Kelly believed the direction the traditionalist Catholic movement was being led in by excommunicated French Archbishop Marcel Lefebvre was too liberal.

The congregation and its motherhouse are based out of St. Joseph's Novitiate in Round Top, New York, with additional convents located nationally in Melville, New York, on Long Island, and St. Anne's Chapel and Academy in White Bear Lake, Minnesota. The congregation considers themselves to be following true Roman Catholicism, and likewise doesn't prefer the word "schism" to describe their separation from the modern-day Vatican, despite the word being technically accurate. The congregation members are "sisters", not "nuns", as they are not cloistered.

== Apostolate and works ==
Location of the congregation's three convents on a map

The congregation defines themselves by their act of Consecration to the Sacred Heart of Jesus, for which prayers of thanks are offered for at least one hour each day. Inside of their convents, the day begins at 6 am with singing and chanting of the Liturgy of the Hours each morning, and a compline consisting of prayers and Psalms nightly. The congregation often partakes in prayer and reflection, studying, and visiting the sick, alongside recreation including board games, cards, chores, sports, and walks. The sisters are also to remain in full religious habit at all times, even when away from the convent shopping or partaking more extreme recreation like motorboating. The purpose of this has been stated to draw attention to them and their cause, as well penance for what they see as immodesty of the modern day. At least in 1988, the sisters followed the custom of silence during meals and were allowed family visits only four times per year, reflecting pre–Vatican II convent traditions.

Outside of their convents, the congregation's primary responsibilities revolve around maintaining their network of missions including churches and schools. These missions include: a church named St. Gertrude's in Sharonville, Ohio, alongside a school named St. Gertrude's Academy, a church and rectory in Oyster Bay, New York, a large building which houses some of the sisters who work as teachers in East Meadow, New York, and a grades 1–12 school centered around the principles of the Society of Saint Pius V in Wantagh, New York. The congregation also maintains smaller and more makeshift missions including: performing a Tridentine Mass at the Warwick New York Hotel in midtown Manhattan each Sunday.

=== St. Joseph's Novitiate ===
The St. Joseph's Novitiate location in Round Top, New York, is the congregation's first location, and contains the main motherhouse of the congregation. Converted from a rundown 14 acres (5.7 ha) resort, the sisters originally lived in a 100-year-old guest house on the site, but worshipped at a newly built church made out of cedar wood. In 1988, the location consisted of the church and three wooden buildings, one of which housed Kelly and the other two the convent. Several more wooden buildings were under construction at this time to serve as new housing for the convent, and a graveyard.

=== Long Island convent ===
The congregation's second location in Melville, New York, opened no later than 1988. It primarily involves itself in maintaining their nearby network of mission locations described above, possibly including: the Society of Saint Pius V grades 1–12 school in Wantagh, the church and rectory in Oyster Bay, and the houses for sisters in East Meadow, all in Nassau County, Long Island. The Long Island convent was also the one involved in the Daughters of Mary, Mother of Our Savior v. LaSalle lawsuit.

=== St. Anne's Chapel and Academy ===
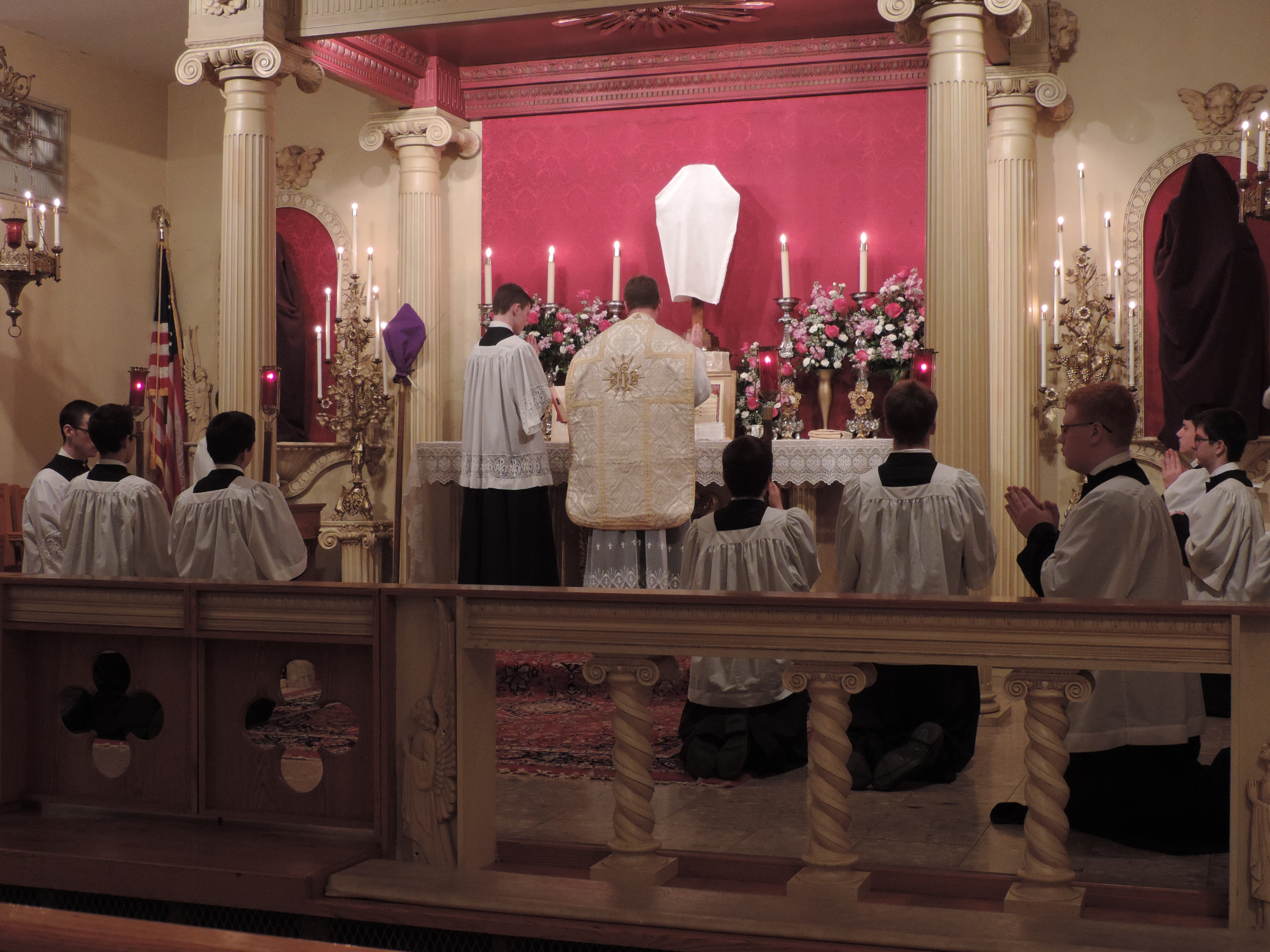
A daily mass being performed at St. Anne's Chapel and Academy in 2015

The congregation has a church and school at St. Anne's Chapel and Academy in White Bear Lake, Minnesota, which consists of a number of plain gray buildings, one of which houses a small grades 1–12 school building. The school, which is taught by the sisters of the congregation, includes classes on topics such as church history, French, physics, and religion. Students participate in regular chores as well as extracurriculars including and a yearly spring concert, which in the past has included secular music from plays like The Sound of Music and The Jungle Book. The school also has a playground for recess, where the sisters are known to participate in games such as basketball, dodgeball, jump rope, soccer, tennis, and volleyball; the sight of which has been known to slow traffic on County Road E. which overlooks the playground. Guidelines for the students generally forbid them from watching PG-13 and R-rated movies, vulgar music, and, at least during 2006, using the internet without a parent. The school requires school uniforms. In 2006, the school consisted of 60 students and seven sisters, with an annual tuition payment of US$900 to $1,300. As for the chapel, a daily mass in Latin is held in which students are required to attend. The pews are separated by gender, and often include confession afterwards. As is the congregation as a whole, the church is not recognized by the Archdiocese of Saint Paul and Minneapolis, or listed on their registries.

== History ==
Total congregation members
Year	Pop.	±% p.a.
1988	21	—
2006	49	+4.82%
2016	68	+3.33%
2019	86	+8.14%

The congregation was founded in 1984 by Rev. Clarence Kelly after he purchased a rundown 14 acres (5.7 ha) resort in the Catskill Mountains for $99,000, which became the St. Joseph's Novitiate. The decision to make a congregation was made by Kelly after he and his fellow priest colleagues were expulsed from the Society of St. Pius X, and lacked the ordinary jurisdiction needed to make a legally-recognized religious congregation.

It was created in a way where the congregation, its apostolate, and its rules were to be decided by Kelly alone with no oversight from his fellow priest colleagues starting the congregation with him, much to their dismay.

In 1988, four years after being founded, the congregation had a total of 21 members consisting of nine sisters and 12 priests associated with the Society of Saint Pius V. During this time, they maintained a network of 50 missions: including 20 churches and five school buildings. Their most successful missions were their school in Wantagh which maintained a total of 70 students, and their church and academy in Sharonville which averaged 800 worshipers on Sundays.

In 2006, the total number of members had increased to 49, consisting of sisters and postulants. 19 more members had joined by 2016, and by 2019, they had 86 members.

=== Alleged kidnapping of Sister Mary Cecelia ===
On June 26, 1988, 22-year-old Sister Mary Cecelia of the congregation, previously Mary Sue Greve, was kidnapped by her family while on a walk with two other sisters. The incident was carried out by Cecelia's father, two brothers, and another man, and happened just outside St. Joseph's Novitiate. A sister from the congregation characterized the incident as violent, stating that Sister Cecelia hit her head several times and was screaming. The incident made national news, and was quickly investigated by the New York State Police and Federal Bureau of Investigation (FBI), who located her within a few days back in her previous home in Cincinnati, Ohio. The incident was orchestrated by her mother, Susan Greve, who claimed she did not want to "lose" her only daughter to a convent, after previously losing one to a stillbirth. While the mother had originally introduced Sister Cecelia to the Society of Saint Pius V, she claimed her daughter did not have a vocation and was never happy in the congregation. This argument was challenged by Kelly, who claimed Sister Cecelia had already spent nearly two years there, and had promised before God she knew she was free to leave at any time.

The parent's plan was ultimately successful. After returning home, the sister renounced her pledge to the congregation and went back to using her given name. A few days later, Greve appeared on national television on The Phil Donahue Show to discuss the incident, where she claimed a "very nice woman" her family brought her to after the kidnapping convinced her the advice and pressure she received in the congregation was wrong. The incident was credited by The New York Times to have revived discussion about parents' responsibility in relation to their children's freedom. The police and FBI's decision to end their investigation after locating the sister was argued by Kelly as ignoring a "heinous crime" and creating "a dangerous precedent".

=== Daughters of Mary, Mother of Our Savior v. LaSalle ===
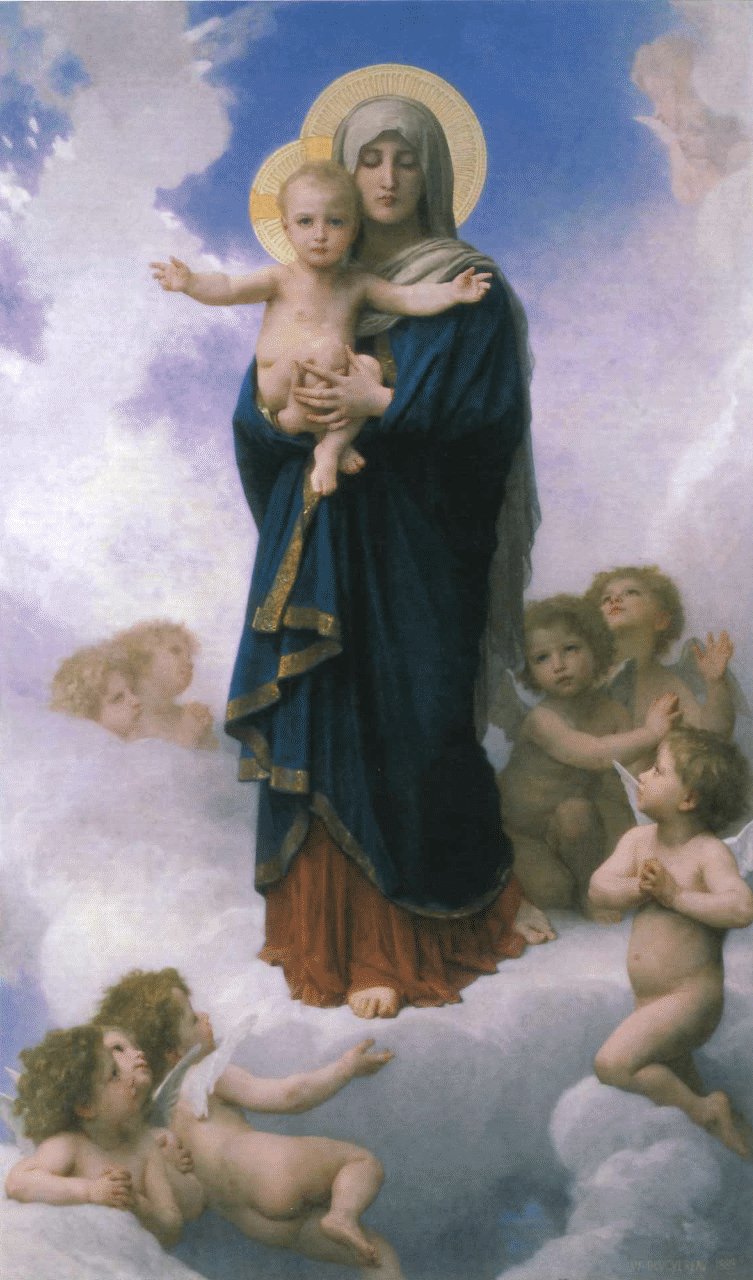
Notre Dame des Anges by William-Adolphe Bouguereau, 1889.

In February 2009, the congregation filed a lawsuit in the New York Supreme Court against Albany-based art appraiser, Mark LaSalle, and Santa Fe-based art dealer, Mark Zaplin, for fraud over the sale of an artwork which the congregation sold to them. The congregation claimed the two colluded to defraud them of $1.75 million they believed they could have obtained through the sale of Notre Dame des Anges, an 1889 artwork by William-Adolphe Bouguereau that depicts Mary, mother of Jesus, standing in clouds with the Infant Jesus surrounded by angels. Represented by New York City attorney Bruce Goldstone, the congregation claimed in their lawsuit the two had committed fraud "intentionally", "deliberately", and "maliciously" against them.

LaSalle was hired by sisters of St. Joseph's Novitiate in 2004 to appraise the artwork, as they believed it was valuable. LaSalle concluded that it could be worth between $150–250,000 without restoration, though likely more with. Art dealer Paul Dumont, who specialized in finding favorable art deals and notifying gallery owners, contacted Zaplin who asked to buy the piece. After the work was restored, Zaplin, who did not meet with the sisters, offered $350,000. After there was a counteroffer of $450,000, Zaplin matched it and purchased the piece in 2006. Grounds for the lawsuit began the following year after Zaplin sold the piece for $2.15 million through a Sotheby's in Texas, making $1.75 million in profit.

Believing LaSalle knew the piece was worth between $1.5–1.8 million before restorations, the sisters sought the $1.75 million in profit Zaplin made from the resell, as well as an additional $51 million in punitive damages. Zaplin defended the sale by stating the lawsuit was made out of seller's remorse, and that he was just "very lucky" in the resell. Goldstone countered by stating LaSalle had knowingly made a "lowball" appraisal to make a significant return with Zaplin, supported by an affidavit made by Dumont in court who quoted LaSalle as saying "we could 'screw' the sisters and make a handsome profit". The day of the trial in January 2012, however, the jury found no fraud in LaSalle's appraisal or Zaplin's purchase after less than a day of deliberation. The jury additionally awarded LaSalle and Zaplin a total of $575,000 in damages under their counterclaim for defamation.

== Public image ==
Reception of the congregation is mixed. Positive feedback has been given regarding the good behavior and politeness of students attending St. Anne's Chapel and Academy, as well as its emphasis on faith. While not its main purpose, it is common for female students attending the academy to desire joining the congregation as sisters themselves, for which they are "encouraged to pray and ponder on it". Parents of many of the sisters in the congregation have also supported their daughters decision to join.

Conversely, Chancellor of the Diocese of Rockville Centre John Alesandro stated he did not "agree with them, and neither do 999,900,000 other Catholics. There are a billion Catholics in the world, and maybe 100,000 followers of Archbishop Lefebvre or people who have broken from Archbishop Lefebvre". He further remarked the congregation "can call themselves whatever they want, traditionalists or whatever, but they are not the Catholic Church". Anthony Cekada, a priest who was a colleague of Kelly during the founding of the congregation, later dissociated with Kelly and referred to the congregation as a "cult". His reasons for doing so revolved around Kelly's sole control of the congregation without oversight from his priest colleagues (including himself), guilt and fear tactics used to maintain obedience, and beliefs Cekada claims Kelly pressured on the congregation: those beliefs included labeling advice from outside priests as unreliable, telling potential sisters they faced possible damnation if they refused to join, portraying departure from the organization as ingratitude to the Sacred Heart, and threatening lawsuits and denunciations for other congregations if they tried to accept or give the Eucharist to a sister who had left the congregation, at least while the congregation had Kelly as its head.

Further mixed reception has come from the congregation's perception in the news. After the 1988 kidnapping incident, Greve's mother, who was responsible for her kidnapping from the congregation, called the group a "cult" which was a "splinter of a splinter group" (referring to the Society of Saint Pius V) where her daughter had "lost her free will". Kelly responded by stating "[the family] took her by force and brought in a woman who was paid a lot of money to brainwash her. If there's anything cultish about it, it's the way the Greves acted". Sister Mary Teresa of the congregation said she received a number of worried calls from relatives following the incident, as "you don't expect to hear about this place nationwide", but reassured that "I know the priest, I know the sisters, I know they are great people". Sister Mary Teresa's father further remarked "I let my children choose their own life. I don't see it as a cult at all. Cults hold people captive. We talked to our daughter. She feels she has a calling, I respect that. If I thought that this was a cult for a moment, I'd be down here myself to take her out".

The congregation has also featured in photographs in various newspapers. One of these, taken in 2004 by photographer for The Cincinnati Enquirer Sarah Conard, depicted the nuns holding each other's habits while ice skating at the Northern Kentucky Ice Center. The photograph went on to win the Associated Press Managing Editors Association's national "Showcase Photo" of the month, a number of trade awards, and was highlighted during The Cincinnati Enquirer's 175th anniversary in 2017.

== Music ==
"Good holy songs [are important], because it is said 'he who sings once prays twice.'"

— Sister Maria Goretti of the congregation, May 2006 interview with Minnesota Star Tribune

As of 2026, the congregation has released ten albums, beginning with Rejoice in 1994, and their most recent being Cor Jesu in 2018. In their music, the congregation emphasizes traditional Catholic music and Gregorian chants. The albums Rejoice and A Traditional Christmas were highlighted by The Cincinnati Enquirer during Christmas time for their season-related tracks. Their music has been used in modern media, with the song "Ave Maris Stella" being used at the end of season 11 episode 9 of The X-Files in a scene taking place at a church.

Discography of the Daughters of Mary, Mother of Our Savior
Album	Release date	# songs	Album length	Ref(s).
Rejoice	1994	20	1 hour, 1 minute	
De Profundis	December 8, 1995	20	1 hour, 1 minute	
Gregorian Hymns	December 8, 1995	20	1 hour, 5 minutes	
Angelic Voices	1996	19	58 minutes, 5 seconds	
I Need Thee	February 2, 1998	21	1 hour, 2 minutes	
Mary of Graces	February 2, 1998	20	1 hour, 2 minutes	
A Traditional Christmas	November 1, 2001	14	1 hour, 7 minutes	
A Day in the Cloister	December 1, 2010	28	1 hour, 14 minutes	
Caritas	October 27, 2014	17	48 minutes, 20 seconds	
Cor Jesu	November 17, 2018	14	56 minutes, 16 seconds	

== See also ==
- List of Catholic religious institutes
- Daughters of Mary of the Immaculate Conception – similarly named, have interacted with each other before
- Mass of Paul VI – the most common Catholic mass, displacing the Tridentine Mass practiced by the congregation
- Society of Saint Pius X – Traditionalist Catholic society from which Clarence Kelly split
