= Clarence Kelly =

American sedevacantist Catholic bishop (1941–2023)

His Excellency, the Most Reverend Clarence Kelly
- Superior General of the Society of Saint Pius V
- Installed: 1983
- Term ended: December 2, 2023
- Predecessor: Office established
- Successor: William Jenkins
- Other post: Founder of the Congregation of Saint Pius V

Orders
- Ordination: April 14, 1973 by Marcel Lefebvre
- Consecration: October 19, 1993 by Alfredo Méndez-Gonzalez

Personal details
- Born: Clarence James Kelly; November 23, 1941 Brooklyn, New York, U.S.
- Died: December 2, 2023 (aged 82)
- Denomination: Catholic

Ordination history of Clarence Kelly
History
Priestly ordination
- Ordained by: Marcel Lefebvre
- Date: April 14, 1973
- Place: The International Seminary of Saint Pius X, Écône, Switzerland
Episcopal consecration
- Consecrated by: Alfredo Méndez-Gonzalez
- Date: October 19, 1993
- Place: Carlsbad, California, U.S.
Episcopal succession
Bishops consecrated by Clarence Kelly as principal consecrator
- Joseph Santay: February 28, 2007

Styles of Clarence Kelly
- Reference style: His Excellency; The Most Reverend
- Spoken style: Your Excellency
- Religious style: Bishop

Clarence James Kelly SSPV (November 23, 1941 – December 2, 2023) was an American sedevacantist Catholic bishop. He was a co-founder of the Society of Saint Pius V and the founder of the Congregation of Saint Pius V.

Kelly attended the Catholic University of America between 1967 and 1969 where he studied philosophy. He began his theology studies in 1969 at the Seminary of the Immaculate Conception in Huntington, New York.

== Priesthood ==
=== Society of Saint Pius X (SSPX) ===
In 1971, Clarence Kelly joined the Society of Saint Pius X (SSPX) Seminary at Écône, Switzerland. On April 24, 1973, in Écône, Kelly was ordained a priest for the Society by Archbishop Marcel Lefebvre. After his ordination, he returned to the United States and undertook some speaking engagements for the John Birch Society. He eventually became the superior of the SSPX's North-East district of the United States.

=== Society of Saint Pius V (SSPV) ===
Archbishop Lefebvre directed the SSPX's priests to follow the 1962 liturgical books. Fr Kelly and eight other American priests refused to do this. On April 27, 1983, these nine priests, along with some seminarians who were sympathetic to them, were expelled from the SSPX by Lefebvre for their refusal to use the 1962 Missal and for other reasons, such as their resistance to Lefebvre's order that priests of the SSPX must accept the decrees of nullity handed down by diocesan marriage tribunals and their disapproval of the SSPX's policy of accepting into the society new members who had been ordained to the priesthood according to the revised sacramental rites of Paul VI.

Almost immediately, these priests, with Kelly as their leader, formed the Society of Saint Pius V (SSPV), which held that it is at least a debatable question whether the popes since 1958 have been legitimate Roman Pontiffs. The Society does not believe that it has the right to decide the question of sedevacantism definitively, but believes that "those who presently are thought to be occupying hierarchical positions in the Catholic Church are acting, for the most part, as though they do not have the Faith, according to all human means of judging". They reject any changes to the Mass (including changes made to the Holy Week Ceremonies by Pope Pius XII in 1955), and adhere to the preconciliar Code of Canon Law. They view as doubtfully valid any ordinations performed after the changes to the Sacrament of Holy Orders. Kelly was replaced by Father Richard Williamson as the superior of the SSPX's North-East district of the United States.

In part due to Kelly's rejection of the validity of sedevacantist bishops consecrated by or in the lineage of Bishop Ngô Đình Thục, some of the original priests of the SSPV, such as Father Daniel Dolan, Father Anthony Cekada, Father Donald Sanborn, and Father Thomas Zapp, broke away from the society.

In 1984, Kelly purchased a former Catskills resort in Round Top, New York, and established St. Joseph's Novitiate. There he also founded the Daughters of Mary, Mother of Our Savior, a congregation of religious sisters.

Lengthy litigation followed the expulsion of Kelly and others from the SSPX over the disposition of property and churches. In 1985, Kelly, Cekada, Dolan, and Sanborn sued Schmidberger, Williamson, Bolduc, and others related to the SSPX for libel.

== Episcopacy ==
On October 19, 1993, in Carlsbad, California, Kelly was consecrated a bishop by Bishop Alfredo Méndez-Gonzalez, the retired Bishop of Arecibo, Puerto Rico.

In 1996, Kelly founded the Congregation of Saint Pius V (not to be confused with the Society of Saint Pius V, which he co-founded earlier), a society for priests and coadjutor brothers.

On February 28, 2007, he consecrated Father Joseph Santay, CSPV, as a bishop. On December 27, 2018, Kelly served as the co-consecrator in Santay's episcopal consecration of Father James Carroll, CSPV.

== Personal life and death ==
Kelly resided at Immaculate Heart Seminary. He died on December 2, 2023, at the age of 82. A Solemn Pontifical Requiem Mass was celebrated for the repose of his soul in the chapel of St. Pius V in Melville, New York, on December 6. His funeral, in the form of a Solemn High Requiem Mass, was celebrated on December 7 in St. Joseph's Novitiate Chapel in Round Top, New York, after which he was buried in the nearby cemetery.

== Books ==
- Conspiracy against God and Man (Western Islands, 1974)
- The Sacred and the Profane (Seminary Press, 1997)
- The Case of Fr. Leonard Feeney
