= O Mary of Graces =

Traditional Irish Catholic hymn

- Cover of the 1998 Daughters of Mary, Mother of Our Savior album "Mary of Garces," named after the hymn, and included as the first track

Hymn
- Language: English
- Songwriters: Douglas Hyde; J. Rafferty

Hymn tune

O Mary of Graces is a traditionally Catholic Marian hymn based on an ancient Irish prayer to Mary, the mother of Jesus. Two versions of the hymn exist based on differing translations made of the original prayer by Douglas Hyde and J. Rafferty, with the Hyde version being more popular.

In modern history, the hymn has been present in a number of hymnals, weddings, and music performances by Catholic schools. Covers of the hymn have also been made by religious sister congregations including the Daughters of Mary, Mother of Our Savior and the Sisters of the Holy Humility of Mary.

== Translation ==
The hymn originates from an ancient Irish prayer to Mary, the mother of Jesus. It was later translated into English and turned into a hymn by the Irish-Anglican academic and linguist Douglas Hyde, and another man named J. Rafferty. The differing translations of the prayer became two versions of the hymn, which despite a difference in translation and melody patterns, hold very similar rhythms.

Below, the two versions of the hymn are displayed. Both versions are formatted the same way the Hyde version was displayed in the May 1914 newspaper segment from The Catholic Columbian as to aid in comparison.

O Mary of Graces
And Mother of God
May I tread in the paths
That the righteous have trod.

And mayest thou save me
From evil's control,
And mayest thou save me
In body and soul.

And mayest thou save me
By land and by sea,
And mayest thou save me
From tortures to be.

May the guard of the angels
Above me abide,
May God be before me
And God at my side.

— Translation by Douglas Hyde

O Mary of graces,
And mother of Christ,
O may you direct me
And guide me aright.

O may you protect me
From Satan's control,
And may you protect me
In body and soul.

O may you protect me
By land and by sea,
And may you protect me
From sorrows to be.

A strong guard of angels
Above me provide;
May God be before me
And God at my side.

— Translation by J. Rafferty

The Hyde version of the hymn is sometimes performed with variations, (Note: A less-common version of the hymn sometimes referred to as the 'Laoghaire version' draws its origins from the Hyde version, only differing slightly in the translation of some words.) including a variation with an additional three verses added onto the end not present in the Rafferty version.

== Modern usage ==
In modern history, the hymn is used traditionally in Catholic settings. The Hyde version of the hymn specifically, which is more commonplace than its counterpart, has been used in at least three hymnals, and was the version used in a cover of the hymn by the Catholic religious sisters congregation, the Daughters of Mary, Mother of Our Savior, for their likewise-named album "Mary of Graces".

Other instances of the Hyde and other, unclear, versions of the hymn have been performed for music recitals at the Southwestern Louisiana Institute, by the glee club at Mount Saint Joseph Academy in New York, by the glee club at St. Mary's Star of the Sea School in Pennsylvania, for a record by the Sisters of the Holy Humility of Mary in Pennsylvania, by the glee club at Columbus Catholic High School in Wisconsin, for a music festival by St. Mary's School of Neillsville in Wisconsin, and at a number of Catholic weddings. A unique version of the hymn beginning with an oboe solo was also created by composer William Ferris Chorale in 2007.

The hymn has been performed by choirs, duets, and orchestras, which are sometimes accompanied instruments, including: guitars, harps, organs, synthesizers, oboes, and/or violins. The hymn is uncommonly performed using the traditional Gaelic language, but sung in the same rhythm as one of the two modern versions.
