= Catedral de Nuestra Señora de Guadalupe =

Historic cathedral in Ponce, Puerto Rico

Ponce Cathedral
- Cathedral of Our Lady of Guadalupe
- Catedral de Nuestra Señora de Guadalupe
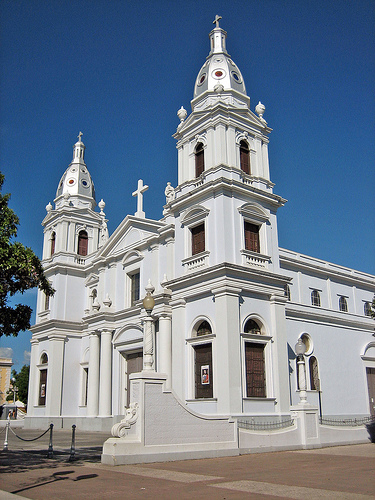
- Front facade of Ponce Cathedral

- Location in Puerto Rico
- 18°00′43″N 66°36′50″W
- Location: Plaza Las Delicias; Ponce, Puerto Rico
- Country: Puerto Rico
- Denomination: Roman Catholic Church

History
- Status: Cathedral
- Founded: September 17, 1692
- Founder: Charles II of Spain
- Dedication: Our Lady of Guadalupe
- Dedicated: 1835

Architecture
- Heritage designation: NRHP
- Designated: 1984
- Architect: Francisco Porrata Doria (1932 facade)
- Style: Neoclassical
- Groundbreaking: 1835
- Completed: 1839

Administration
- Archdiocese: San Juan
- Diocese: Ponce

Clergy
- Bishop: Most Rev. Geraldo Ramírez Torres
- Catedral Nuestra Señora de Guadalupe of Ponce
- U.S. National Register of Historic Places
- Built: 1839
- MPS: Historic Churches of Puerto Rico MPS
- NRHP reference No.: 84000467
- Added to NRHP: December 10, 1984

The Cathedral of Our Lady of Guadalupe (Spanish: Catedral de Nuestra Señora de Guadalupe), or simply Ponce Cathedral, is the cathedral church of the Roman Catholic Diocese of Ponce located in downtown Ponce, Puerto Rico. The cathedral lies in the middle of Ponce's town square, known as Plaza Las Delicias, located at the center of the Ponce Historic Zone. For its historic significance, the cathedral was listed on the National Register of Historic Places in 1984. It is the seat of the Bishop of Ponce, currently Geraldo Ramírez Torres.

The cathedral has a history that dates to 1670. It has been damaged several times by fires and earthquakes. It stands out among Puerto Rico's other four cathedrals for its intricate design. It has a large pipe organ that was played by danza master and composer Juan Morel Campos. Architecturally, it is designed in the neoclassical style. Structurally, it follows a cruciform plan, with a large dome at the crossing. The interior consists of a main nave and two large aisles separated by a series of eight arcades. There are two small chapels in its interior. Two three-story square towers decorate the front facade.

== History ==
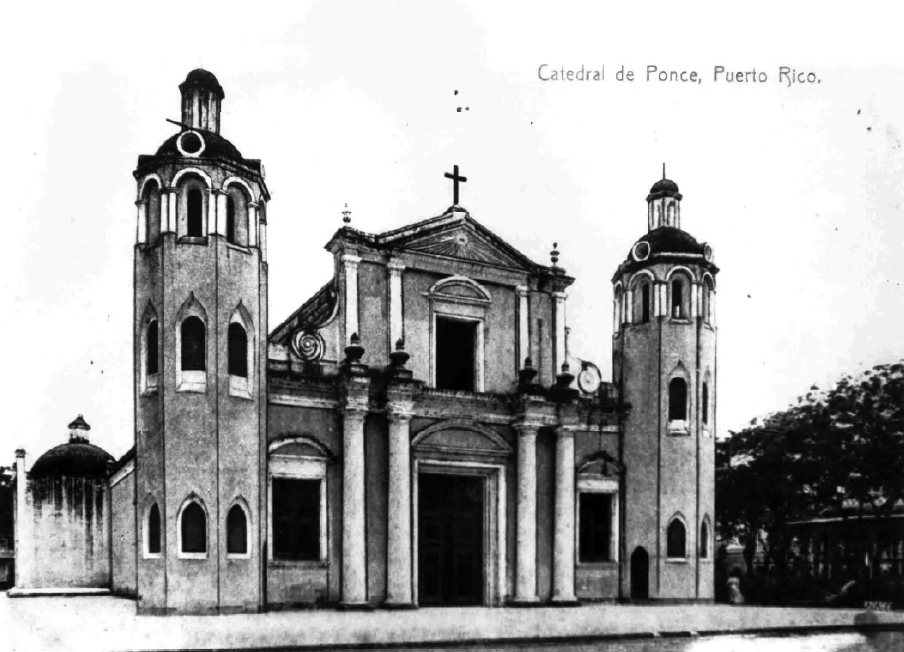
The cathedral, circa 1910, looking east-southeast

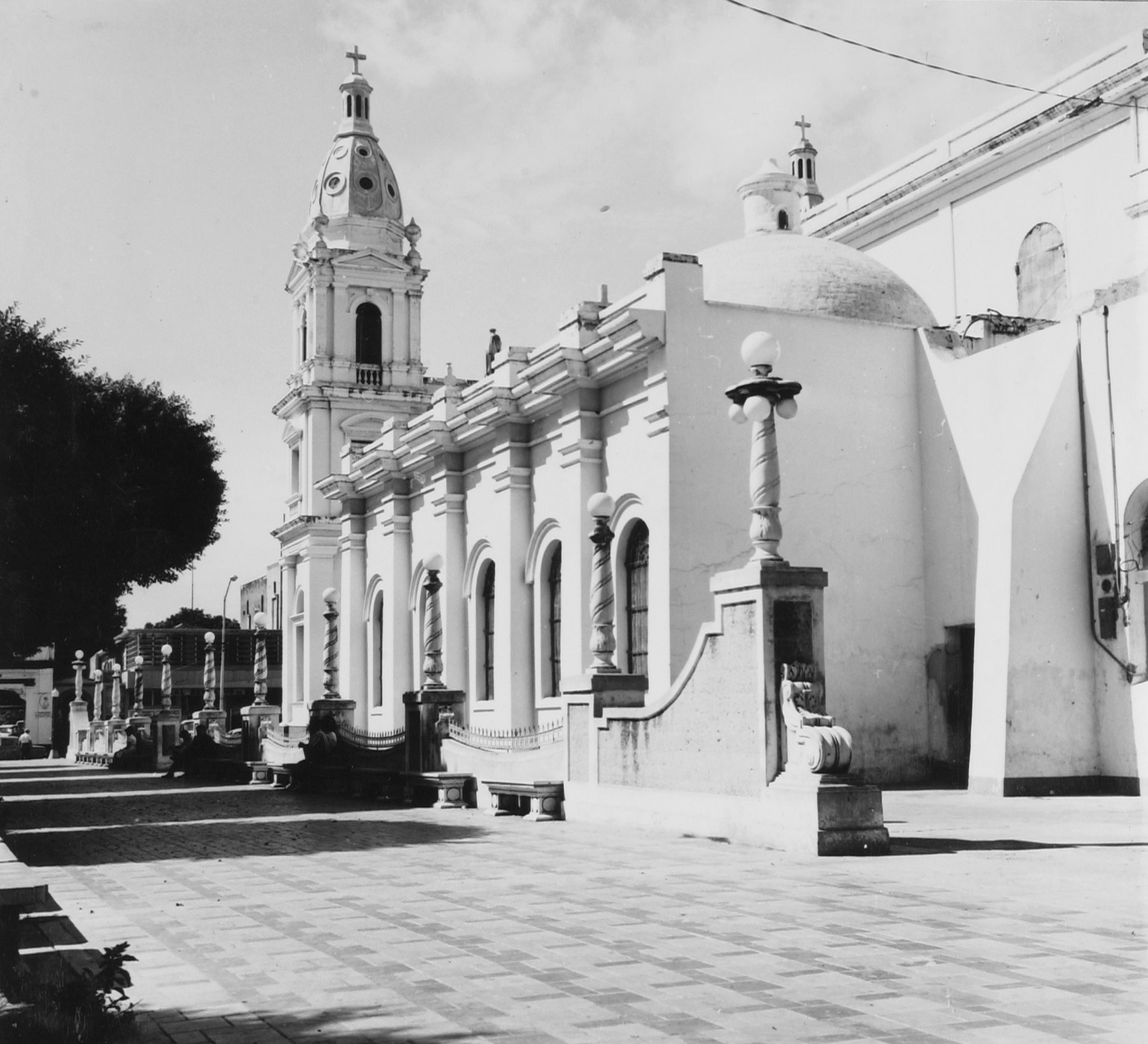
The cathedral in 1964, looking west-northwest

The cathedral has over 300 years of history. In 1670, a small chapel was built in the center of the colonial settlement of Ponce on the site of the present cathedral. On 17 September 1692, the King of Spain, Carlos II, issued a Cédula Real (Royal Permit) designating the chapel as a parish church. In 1835, the original parish church was demolished to build a larger church, which was completed and opened for worship in 1839. Among its new features were two octagonal towers on the corners of the front facade. The original (pre-1918) towers were also three stories high and had windows on each of the sides. They were each topped with a Christian cross.

The cathedral contains a number of burials within its interior. It was among the first burial places in Ponce. However, in 1814 the practice was discontinued due to potential health risks on church worshipers, and based on the edict promulgated in 1784 by King Charles III. On that year the first cemetery in the city located outside a religious structure was built at the block bounded by today's Calle Victoria, Union, Vives and Mendez Vigo. That block is now (2019) occupied by the Terminal de Transportación Pública Carlos Garay.

The building was damaged by several fires and earthquakes during the 19th and 20th centuries including the 1918 San Fermín earthquake, which caused extensive damage, including the destruction of both of the original towers. Despite this, the 1839 building forms the core of the present building, which Pope Pius XI declared a cathedral in 1924. The cathedral's first bishop was Edwin Byrne, who took charge in 1925.

From 1931 to 1937, the church was reconstructed to a design by architect Francisco Porrata Doria. The current facade bears a French neoclassical style. Among these improvements were the addition of two new chapels, a new roof, the remodelling of the upper storey of the facade and the construction of two new, richly decorated square towers. A pipe organ was installed in 1934 and re-inaugurated in 1989 after a nine-year restoration. The building was dedicated by Bishop James E. McManus on 11 April 1950.

== Location ==
The cathedral sits in the center of Ponce's central square, Plaza Las Delicias, oriented east-to-west, with its front entrance facing west. Immediately behind the cathedral, to the east, is the historic fire house, Parque de Bombas. The two buildings effectively divide Plaza Las Delicias into two smaller plazas, named Plaza Muñoz Rivera and Plaza Degetau. Low undulating walls line the cathedral's northern and southern sides, and serve to separate it from the Plazas. Plaza Las Delicias is in barrio Segundo, one of the six core barrios of Ponce that compose Historic Zone designated by the Government of Puerto Rico to preserve the colonial character of the city.

== The building ==
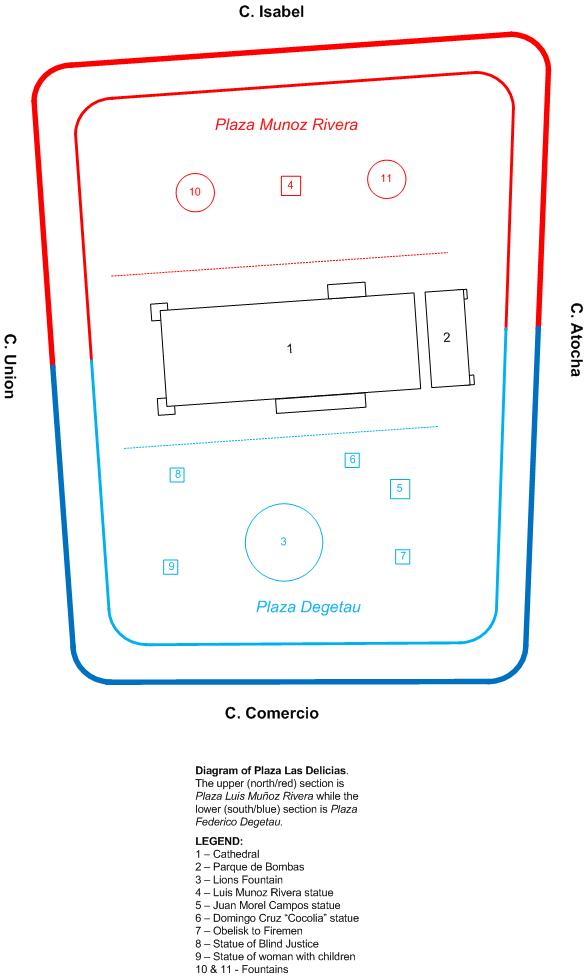
Diagram of Plaza Las Delicias showing the central location of the cathedral within the Plaza

The building's exterior architecture is Neoclassical, while its interior is mostly colonial and Gothic. The current structure is larger than the 1839 structure, having been extended on the south side in 1911 with the addition of the side chapel. It covers an area of 3,540 square yards (2,960 m^{2}). The architecture of the cathedral is neoclassical in style with the exterior painted pale blue and gray and the interior in blue and beige. The building has many stained glass windows depicting religious scenes and two bell towers.

=== Interior plan ===
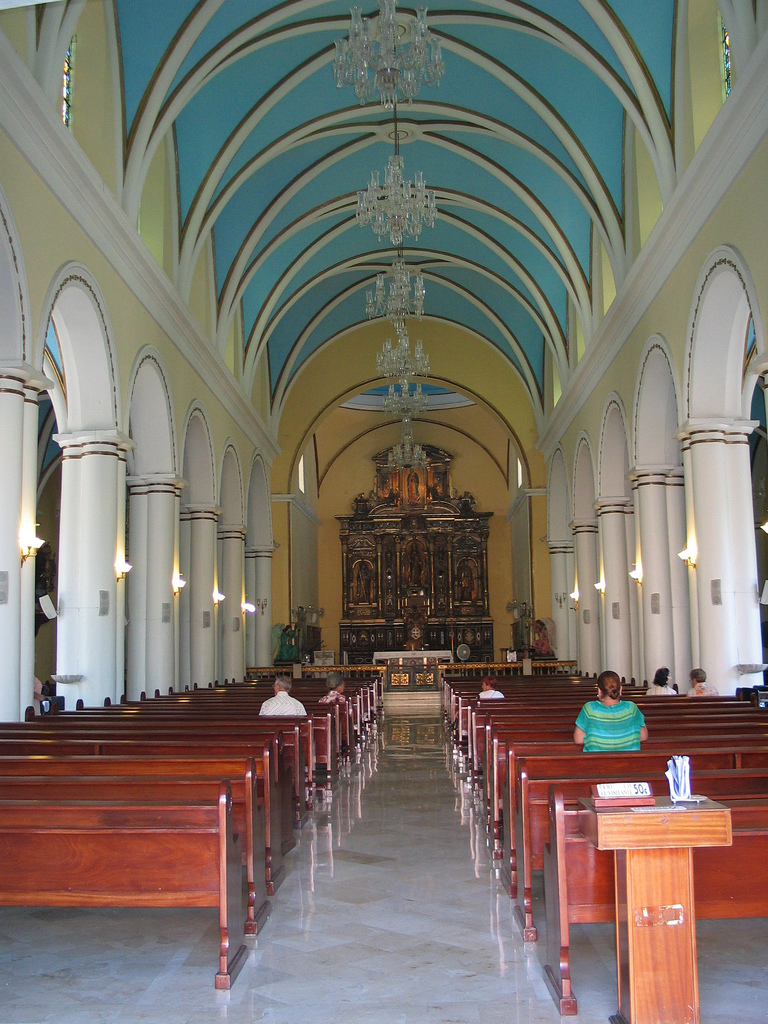
Interior of the cathedral looking east towards the altar, showing the nave, arcades and the cross vaulted ceiling

The footprint of the cathedral is of a cruciform plan. It features a large dome at the crossing of the transept and the nave. The interior consists of eight bays plus the apse. The westernmost bay accommodates the vestibule. Above this vestibule is a second level choir loft, accessible via a wooden stairway connected to the front wall. A large pipe organ, said to have been played by Juan Morel Campos every Sunday for many years, is also on this second level loft. The cathedral measures 42.2m long by 19.4m wide.

Arcades of semi-circular arches divide the nave from the aisles. On the south side of the cathedral, a large chapel, built in 1911, extends three bays parallel to the aisle. This chapel provides a more intimate place of worship than the main church or its aisles. The nave has a cross vaulted ceiling with clerestory windows above the arcades. The cathedral's main neoclassical altar of translucent alabaster is a modern replacement for the original wooden gothic altar, now located in the southern side chapel. The main altar, built in Burgos, Spain, was donated by the local Ferre family. Except for the side chapel where terrazzo is used, the cathedral's floor is of gray and white marble design.

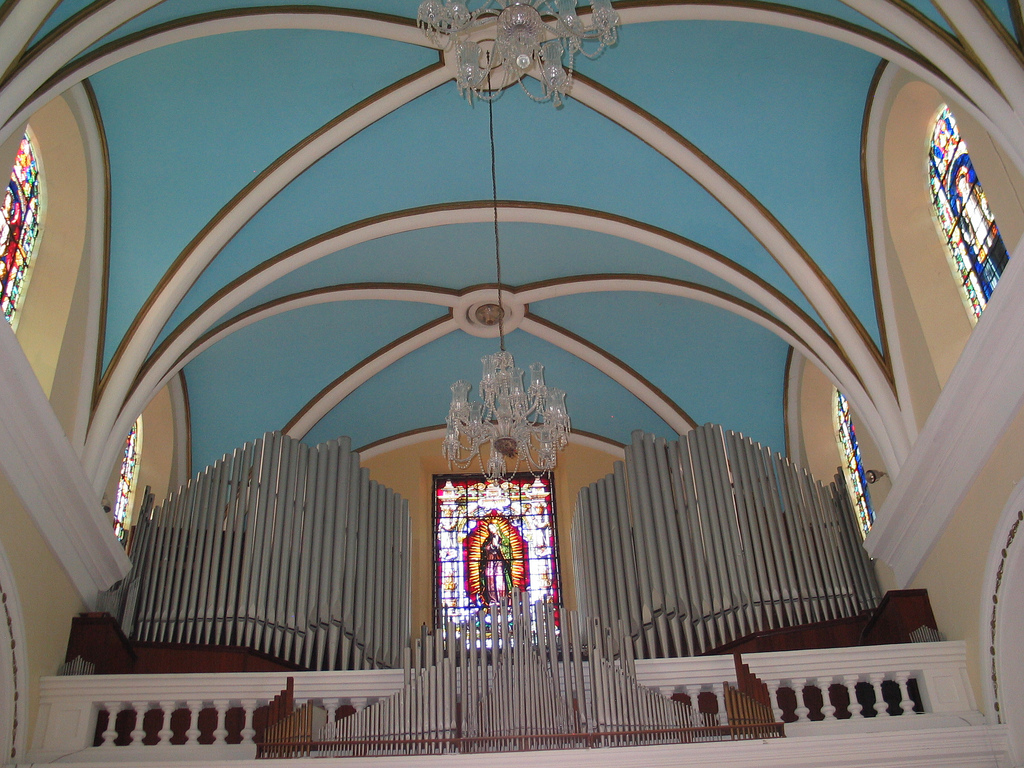
The cathedral's pipe organ on the second floor vestibule loft

=== The front facade ===
The western front facade is flanked by two square towers. They are both three stories high topped with silver domes and a Christian cross on top of these. Both towers have windows at each level. Access to the towers is through either of two small wooden doors located in the interior northwest and southwest corners of the church vestibule.

Entry to the cathedral is through a tall pair of wooden doors in a style reminiscent of church doors of Middle Ages Europe. There are two round columns to each side of these doors, as well as rectangular wooden windows to both sides. Atop the second level of the front facade there is a large triangular pediment, and on top of this pediment sits a Christian cross considerably larger than the two atop the tower domes. There are also two statues standing at each of the two lower ends of the large triangular pediment. Except for the wooden windows and doors, all elements on the front facade are of masonry construction.

== Events ==
On 12 December, the cathedral hosts the annual event known as "Las Mañanitas", named after the Mexican birthday song (English: "Early Mornings"), which is sung during a pre-dawn religious procession in the downtown area to celebrate the day of the Virgin of Guadalupe, the patron saint of Ponce. The event started in 1965. After the procession candle bearers attend Holy Mass at the Cathedral at 5:00 am. Up to 10,000 people attend the event. On 24 December there is also a midnight Mass known as Misa de Gallo (English: Rooster's Mass).

== Hours ==
Except for the Las Mañanitas celebrations, the cathedral is open Monday through Friday from 6:00 am to 12:30 pm, and Saturday and Sunday from 6:00 am to 12:00 pm and from 3:00 pm to 8:00 pm.

== Damage ==
The building was damaged and temporarily closed as a result the 2020 Puerto Rico earthquakes.

== Gallery ==
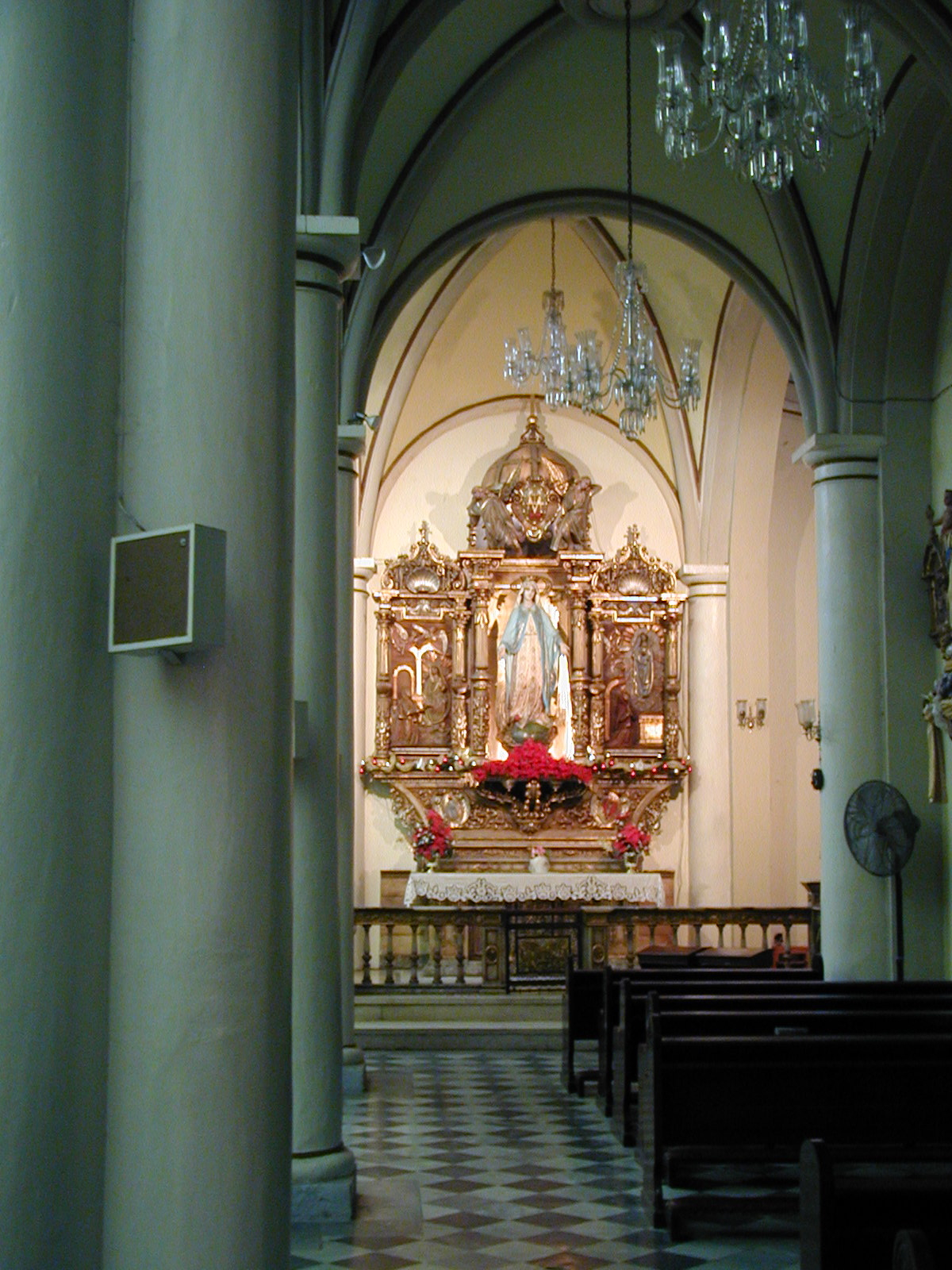
Our Lady of Guadalupe, patroness of Ponce

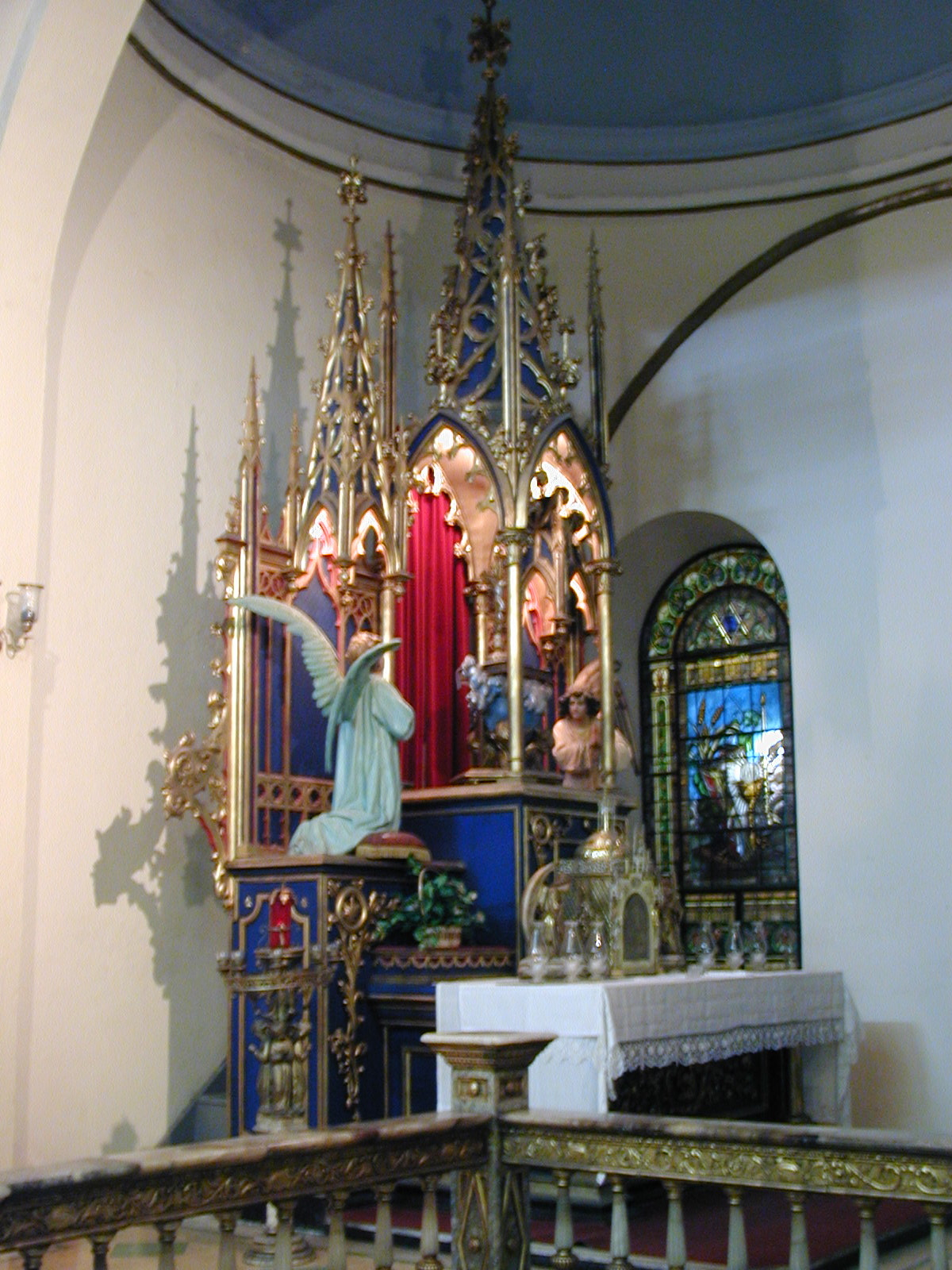
Interior in 2003

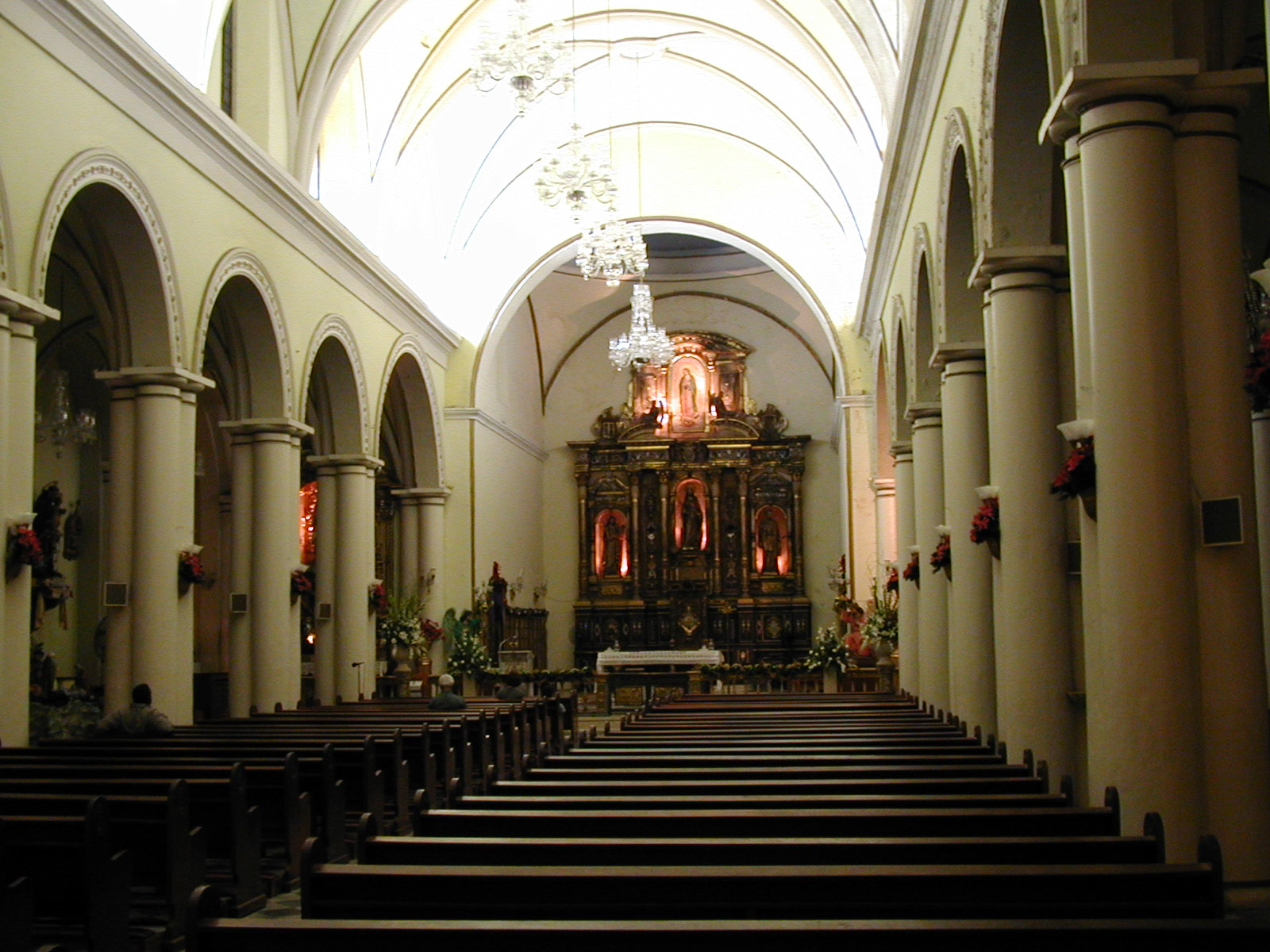
Interior in 2003

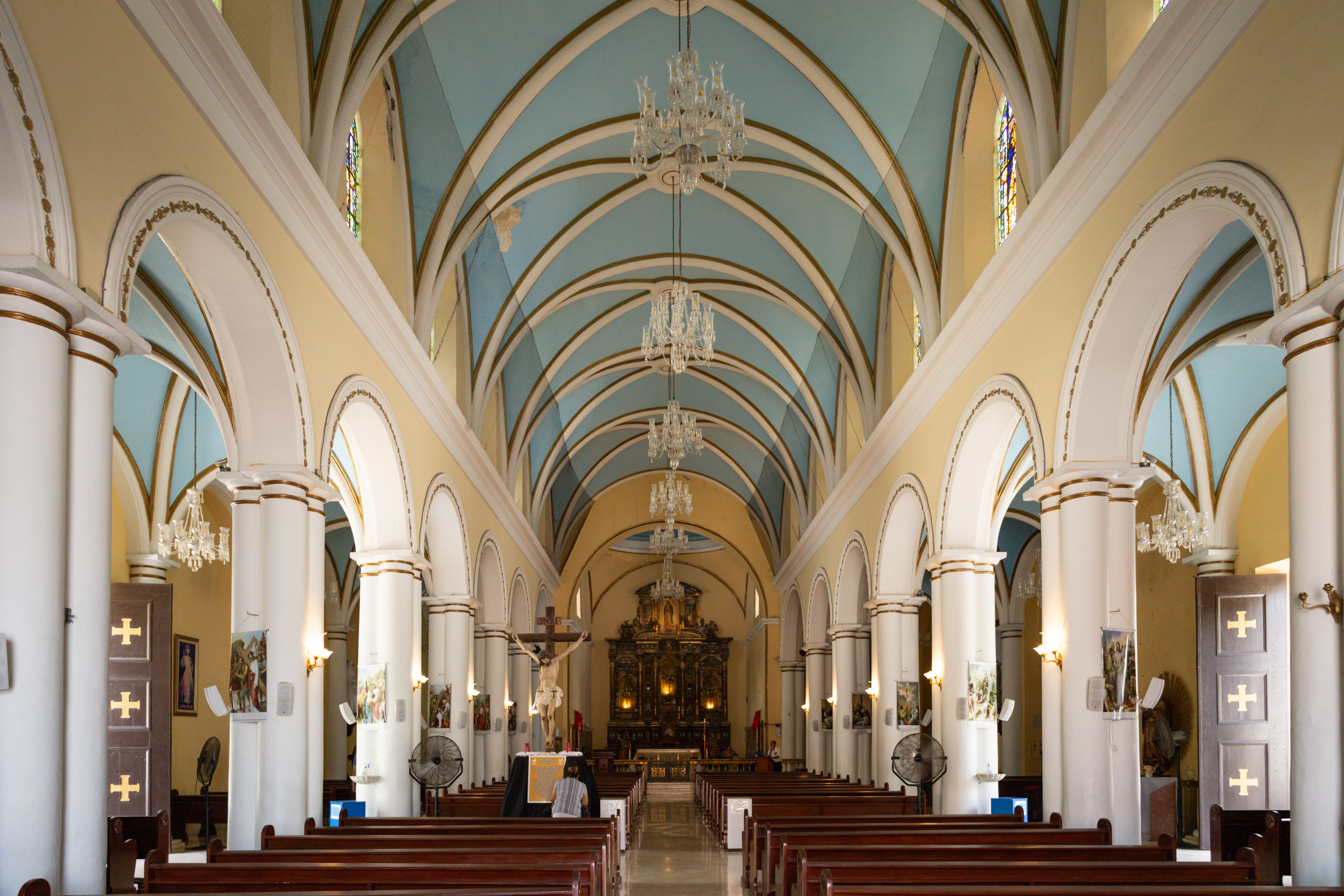
Interior in 2025

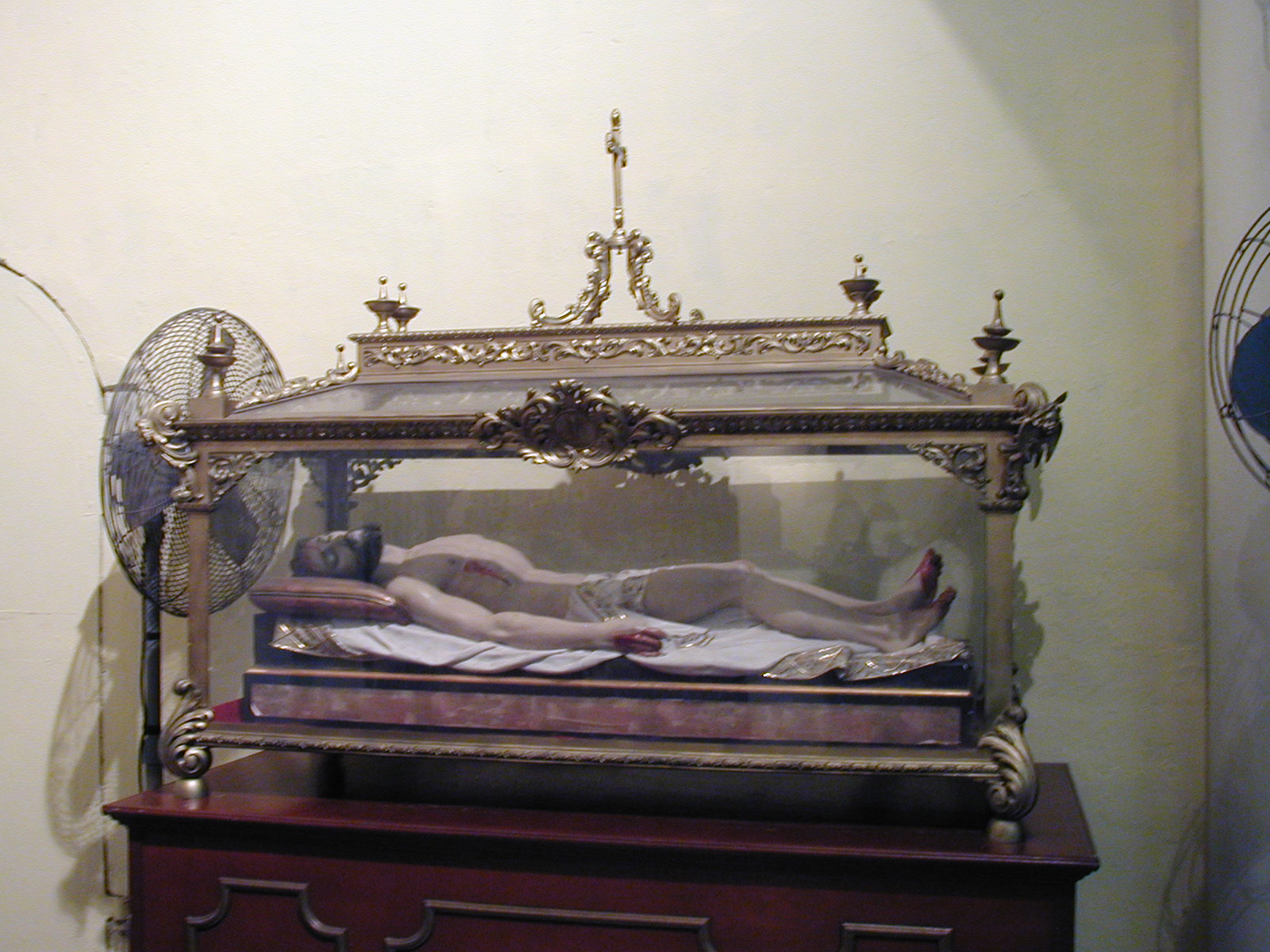
Statue of Christ

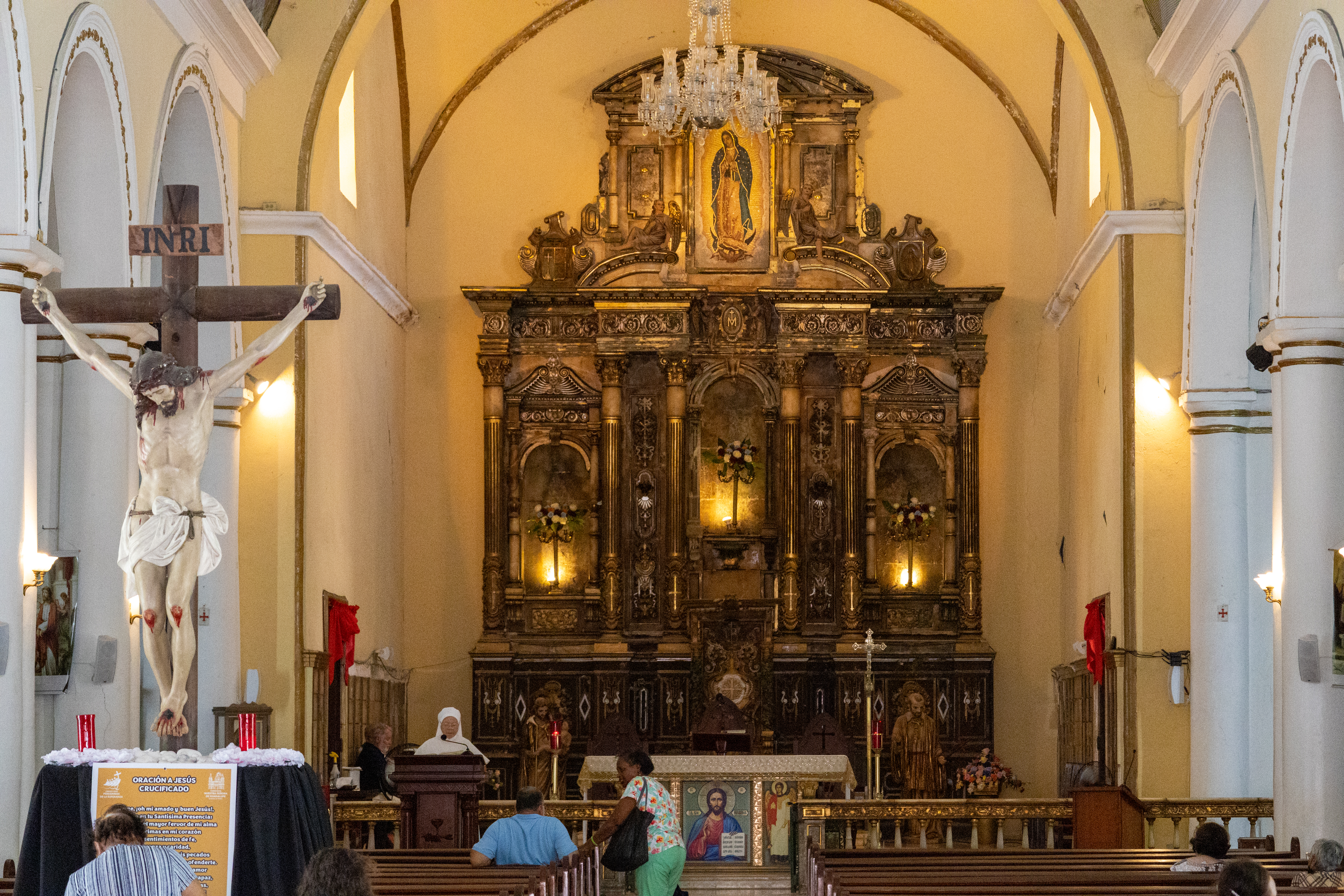
Main altarpiece in 2025

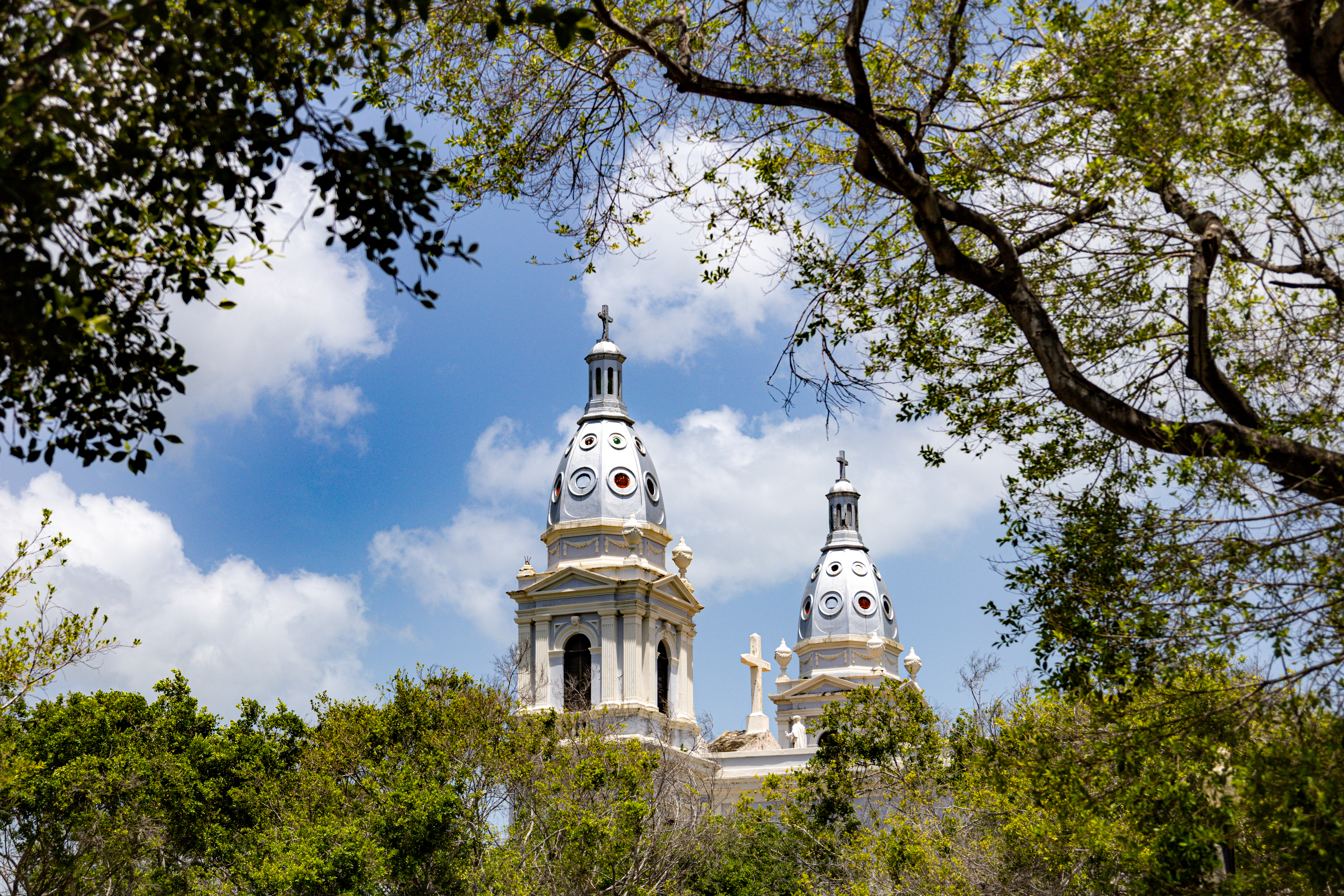
Belltowers in 2025

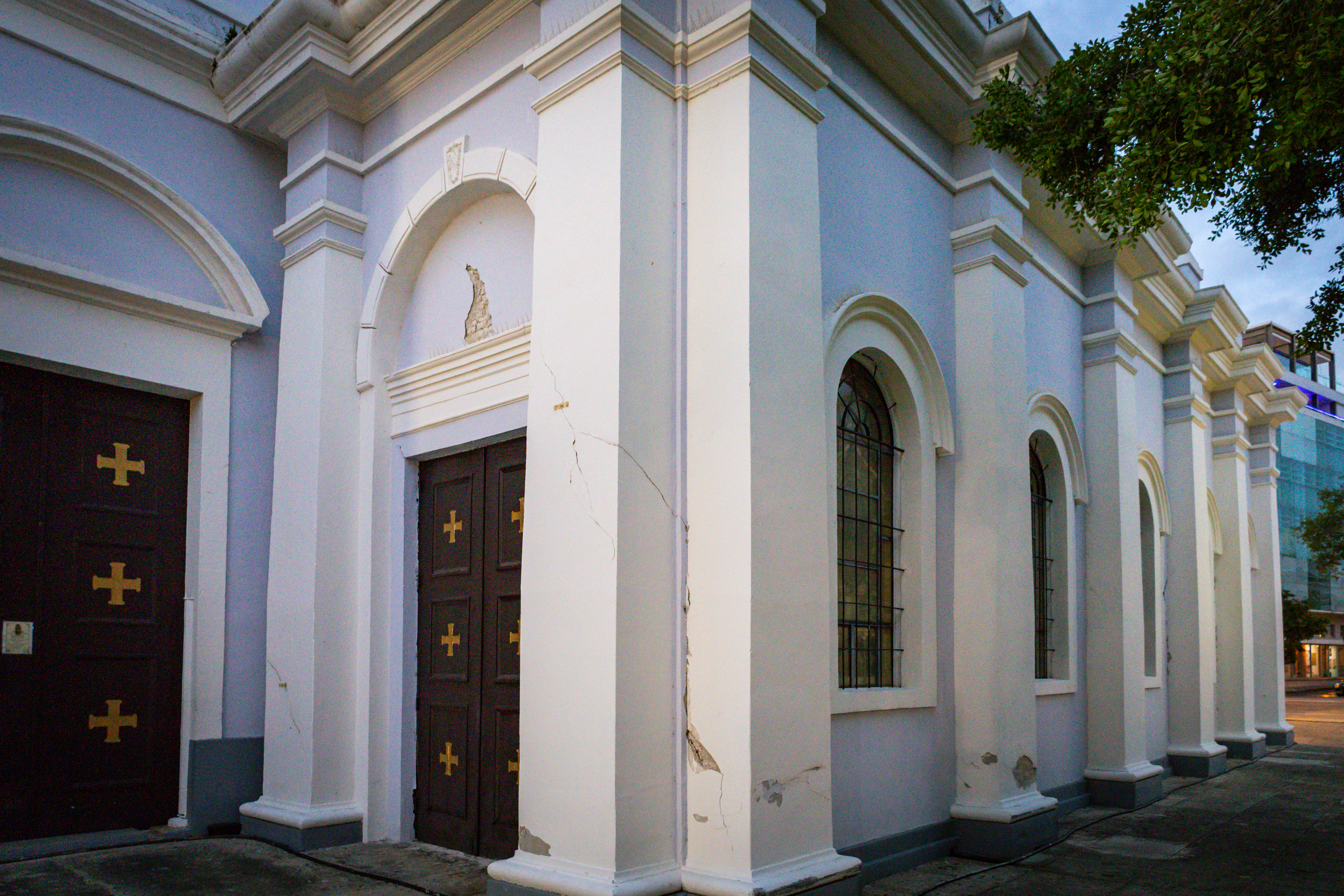
Earthquake damage in 2025

== See also ==
- List of Catholic cathedrals in the United States
- List of cathedrals in the United States
- Roman Catholic Diocese of Ponce
