= Warwick Hotels and Resorts =

Hotel company in the US

Warwick Hotels and Resorts (WHR)
- Type: Private
- Industry: Hospitality, Hotels
- Founded: 1980; New York City, New York; United States
- Founder: Richard Chiu
- Headquarters: Europe:Paris, France; North America:Denver, Colorado; Middle East:Beirut, Lebanon; Asia/South Pacific:Fiji
- Number of employees: [10000+ Emp]
- Website: warwickhotels.com

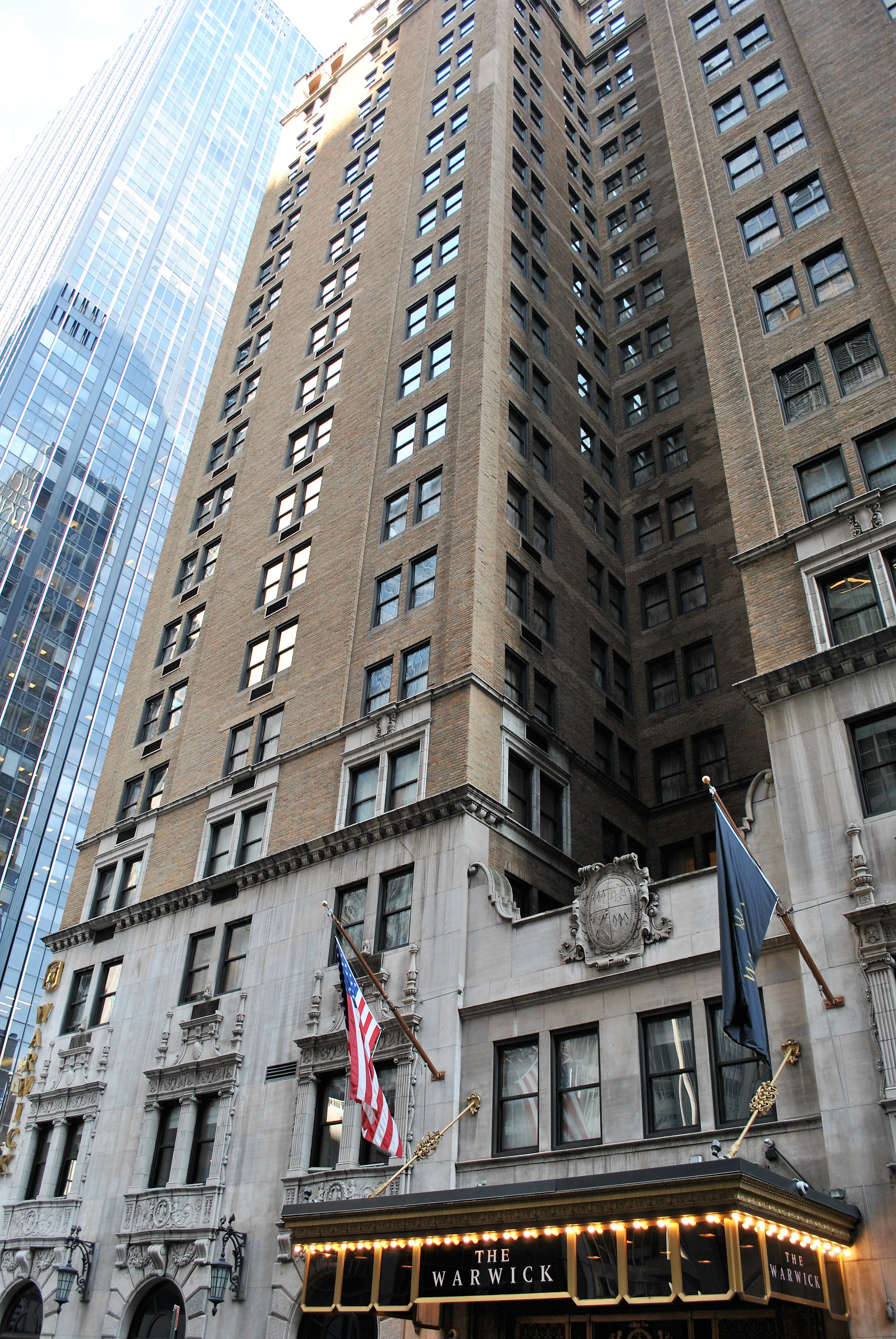
Warwick New York Hotel

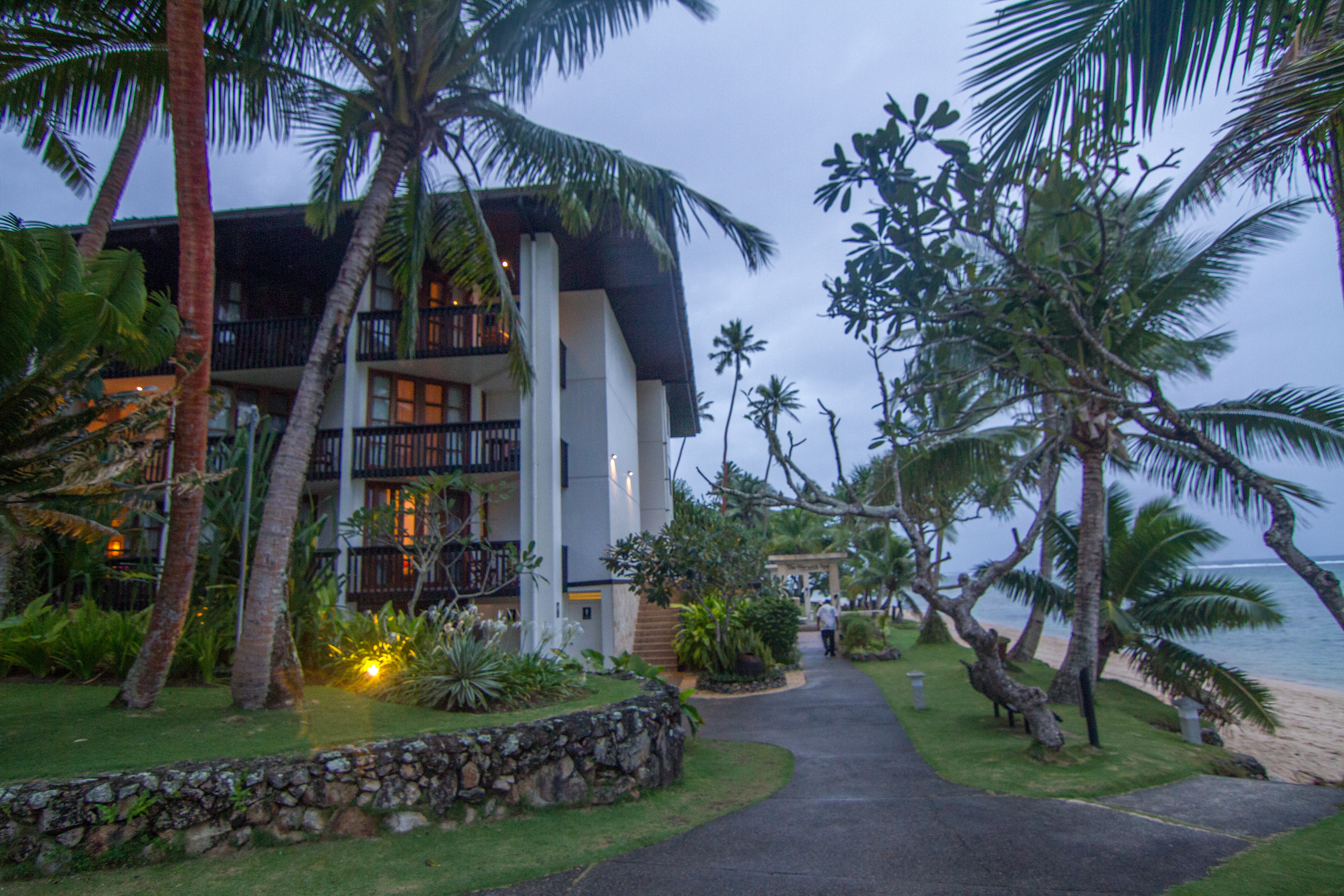
Warwick Fiji Resort & Spa

Warwick Hotels and Resorts (WHR) (formerly Warwick International Hotels) is a global hospitality company. As of January 2023, WHR encompasses over 40 hotels.

The group of hotels, known as The Collection, consists of owned and managed, managed and affiliate member hotels. WHR was founded in 1980 with the purchase of the historic Warwick Hotel in New York City (Warwick New York Hotel) after which the company is named. WHR operates out of 4 regional offices: Europe, located in Paris, France, North America, located in Denver, Colorado, Middle East located in Beirut, Lebanon and Asia/South Pacific located in Fiji.

In June 2016, Warwick International Hotels completed a company-wide rebranding initiative, led by the Columbus, Ohio-based branding agency Blackletter, that included launching a new corporate identity and logo. The brand is now known as Warwick Hotels and Resorts.

== History ==
Richard Chiu, president and founder of WHR, established Warwick Hotels and Resorts in 1980 upon the purchase of the Warwick Hotel located on the corner of Avenue of the Americas and 54th Street in Manhattan, New York City. The Warwick Hotel was originally commissioned by newspaper mogul William Randolph Hearst in 1926 as a homage to the love of his life, Marion Davies, whom he later married, and for the comfortable accommodation of his Hollywood friends while frequenting New York City. It was designed by the world-renowned architect Emery Roth.

Soon after, a foothold was also established in Europe with the acquisition of the Hôtel Warwick Champs-Elysées in Paris, located just off the famous Parisian avenue, Avenue des Champs-Elysées. Other European acquisitions during the early years include: the Warwick Brussels (formerly Royal Windsor Hotel Grand Place) in Brussels, Belgium, the Hôtel Westminster in Paris, located on Rue de la Paix between Place Vendôme and the Palais Garnier opera house, and the Hôtel Warwick Geneva (Warwick Geneva) in Geneva, Switzerland. In North America, the Warwick Denver hotel in Denver, Colorado, and the Warwick Seattle hotel in Seattle, Washington, also joined The Collection.

From its base in America and Western Europe, WHR expanded into resort destinations. The acquisition of a resort on the Coral Coast of Fiji became the Warwick Fiji, a resort & spa. The success of this project spurred further expansion in Fiji and the nearby Naviti Resort was acquired.

Entering the 1990s, the Warwick San Francisco hotel was opened in San Francisco, California, marking the beginning of a decade of robust growth. Growth in the company was driven by a significant new direction for WHR internationally also, with the introduction of an Affiliate Hotel Program. Like WHR, many of these hotels are also family run.

Momentum continued during the 2000s for WHR, which marked WHR's entry into the Middle East and African market and its first foray into management contract agreements. As of October 2014, WHR manages nine hotels in the Middle East and Asia, including Dubai and Baghdad, Jordan and Lebanon, and Bali. This period also saw its Affiliate Hotel Program mature as it adds key gateway cities into its Collection, including Bangkok, Barcelona, Madrid, Zurich and also two hotels in South Africa.

In North America, the Warwick San Francisco recently underwent an extensive renovation program and re-opened in June 2014. In April 2014, the Allerton Hotel located in the middle of The Magnificent Mile in Chicago, IL was acquired by WHR and has since been renamed the Warwick Allerton Chicago home to the Tip Top Tap ballroom on the top floor, once used by Frank Sinatra.

This period also marks WHR's entry into the resort market in the Americas, with the announcement of the Warwick Paradise Island in Nassau, The Bahamas, joining The Collection.

In February 2017, Warwick Hotels and Resorts acquired The Capital Group consisting of the 49-guestroom Capital Hotel and 12-guestroom Levin Hotel, both located in Knightsbridge, London.

In February 2023, Warwick Hotels and Resorts acquires the Hotel Le Crystal located in downtown Montreal, has been named the Warwick Le Crystal-Montreal, WHR’s first hotel in Canada.
