= Diocese of Ponce =

Diocese of the Catholic Church

Coordinates: 18.0118°N 66.6142°W

Diocese of Ponce Dioecesis Poncensis Diócesis de Ponce
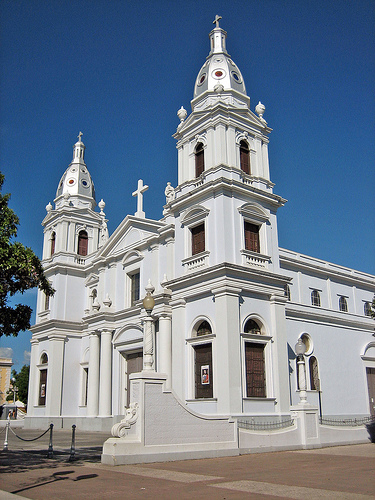
- Catedral de Nuestra Señora de Guadalupe

- Coat of arms

Location
- Country: Puerto Rico
- Territory: Southern portion of Puerto Rico
- Ecclesiastical province: San Juan de Puerto Rico

Statistics
- Area: 2,045 km^{2} (790 sq mi)
- Population: Total; Catholics: (as of 2004); 593,548; 474,959 (80%)
- Parishes: 42

Information
- Denomination: Catholic
- Sui iuris church: Latin Church
- Rite: Roman Rite
- Established: 21 November 1924 (101 years ago)
- Cathedral: Catedral de Nuestra Señora de Guadalupe

Current leadership
- Pope: Leo XIV
- Bishop: Geraldo Ramírez Torres
- Bishops emeritus: Félix Lázaro Martínez; Ruben Antonio Gonzalez Medina

Map
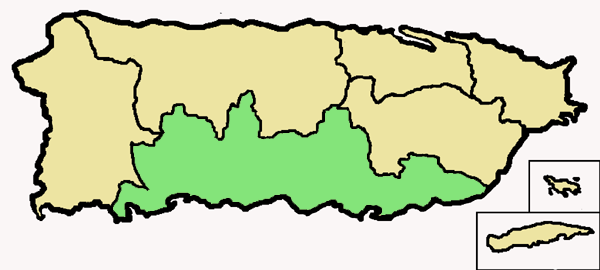

The Diocese of Ponce (Latin: Dioecesis Poncensis) is an ecclesiastical territory or diocese of the Catholic Church in the United States and consists of the southern part of the island of Puerto Rico, a territory of the United States. The diocese is led by a prelate bishop who pastors the mother church in the City of Ponce, the Cathedral of Our Lady of Guadalupe. Its jurisdiction includes the municipalities of Adjuntas, Jayuya, Guánica, Guayanilla, Yauco, Peñuelas, Ponce, Juana Díaz, Villalba, Coamo, Santa Isabel, Salinas, Guayama, Arroyo, and Patillas.

== History ==
In 1978, Bishop Fremiot Torres Oliver acquired a large property in the Rio Chiquito sector of Barrio Portugués where the Diocese is currently (2019) located.

=== Spanish colonial system ===
Under the Spanish colonial system (1692–1898) the Diocese of Ponce operated and its bishop in 1877 was Juan Puig. From 25 October 1892 to 1897, the bishop was Lorenzo Roura y Bayer.

Other Padres Paules bishops at the Cathedral were:

- Lorenzo Roura y Bayer (25 October 1892 – 1897)
- Leonardo G. Villanueva (1897–1898)
- Sturnino Janices (1997–1898)
- Francisco Vicario (1898–1905)
- Luis Vega (1905–1911)
- Cipariano Peña (1911–1919)
- Florencio Garcia (1919–1927)
- Manuel Peña (1927–1931)
- Gonzalo de la Guerra (1931–1937)
- Deogracias Morondo (1937–1940)
- Toribio Marijuan (1940–1945)
- Mariano Bravo (1945–1948)
- Epifanio Garcia (1948–1957)
- Jose Carrasco (1957)

From 1970 on, Padres Paules left Ponce and the Cathedral was then run by the Diocese of Ponce directly.

=== Commonwealth ===
The See of Ponce was canonically erected on 21 November 1924, and is a suffragan diocese of the Metropolitan Province of San Juan de Puerto Rico.

== San Juan Archdiocese bankruptcy ==
On 7 September 2018, Judge Edward Godoy ruled that the bankruptcy filed by the Archdiocese of San Juan would also apply to every Catholic diocese in Puerto Rico, including Ponce, and that all would now have their assets protected under Chapter 11.

== Bishops ==
=== Bishops of Ponce ===
1. Edwin Byrne (1925–1929), appointed Bishop of San Juan de Puerto Rico
2. Aloysius Joseph Willinger (1929–1946), appointed Coadjutor Bishop of Monterey-Fresno
3. James Edward McManus (1947–1963), resigned
4. Luis Aponte Martinez (1963–1964), appointed Archbishop of San Juan de Puerto Rico
5. Juan Fremiot Torres Oliver (1964–2000), retired
6. Ricardo Antonio Suriñach Carreras (2000–2003), retired
7. Félix Lázaro Martínez (2003–2015), retired
8. Ruben Antonio Gonzalez Medina, C.M.F. (2015–2026), retired
9. Geraldo Ramírez Torres (2026-present)

=== Coadjutor bishops ===
- Luis Aponte Martinez (1963–1963)
- Félix Lázaro Martinez (2002–2003)

=== Auxiliary bishops ===
- Luis Aponte Martinez (1960–1963), appointed Coadjutor Bishop of Ponce
- Ricardo Antonio Suriñach Carreras (1975–2000), appointed Bishop of Ponce

== Parish churches ==
Parish churches listed by founding dates:

- 1616 – Iglesia San Blas de Illescas – Coamo
- 1692 – Catedral de Nuestra Señora de Guadalupe – Ponce
- 1736 – San Antonio de Padua – Guayama
- 1756 – Ntra. Sra. del Rosario – Yauco
- 1793 – San José – Peñuelas
- 1798 – Iglesia San Ramón Nonato – Juana Díaz
- 1811 – Inmaculado Corazón de María – Patillas
- 1815 – San Joaquín y Santa Ana – Adjuntas
- 1840 – Inmaculada Concepción – Guayanilla
- 1854 – Ntra. Sra. de Monserrate – Salinas
- 1854 – Santiago Apóstol – Santa Isabel
- 1855 – Ntra. Sra. del Carmen – Arroyo
- 1883 – Ntra. Sra. de Monserrate – Jayuya
- 1883 – Ntra. Sra. del Carmen – Playa (Ponce)
- 1888 – San Antonio Abad – Guánica
- 1917 – Ntra. Sra. del Carmen – Villalba
- 1928 – Ntra. Sra. de la Medalla Milagrosa – Ponce
- 1928 – Ntra. Sra. de la Merced – Ponce
- 1930 – Santa Teresita – Ponce
- 1946 – Sagrado Corazón – Aguirre
- 1948 – San Conrado – Ponce
- 1952 – Santa María Reina – Ponce
- 1959 – Sagrado Corazón de Jesús – Tallaboa (Peñuelas)
- 1962 – Ntra. Sra. de la Divina Providencia – Villalba
- 1963 – Sagrado Corazón – Ensenada (Guánica)
- 1964 – San Vicente de Paúl – Ponce
- 1964 – San Judas Tadeo – Ponce
- 1964 – Cristo Rey – Ponce
- 1965 – San José – Ponce
- 1967 – La Resurrección – Ponce
- 1968 – Buen Pastor – Ponce
- 1969 – San Martín de Porres – Yauco
- 1969 – Corazón de Jesús – Ponce
- 1969 – Ntra. Sra. de la Medalla Milagrosa – Castañer (Adjuntas)
- 1971 – Santísima Trinidad – Ponce
- 1973 – Ntra. Sra. del Carmen – Coto Laurel (Ponce)
- 1979 – San José Obrero – Ponce
- 1984 – Ntra. Sra. de Lourdes – Aguilita (Juana Díaz)
- 1984 – Santa Teresita – Arús (Juana Díaz)
- 1986 – Santísimo Sacramento – Ponce
- 2001 – Santo Domingo de Guzmán – Yauco
- 2001 – San Antonio de Padua – Coamo
- 2005 – Santos Apóstoles Pedro y Pablo – Guayama

== See also ==
- Catholic Church by country
- Catholic Church in the United States
- Ecclesiastical Province of San Juan de Puerto Rico
- Global organisation of the Catholic Church
- List of Roman Catholic archdioceses (by country and continent)
- List of Roman Catholic dioceses (alphabetical) (including archdioceses)
- List of Roman Catholic dioceses (structured view) (including archdioceses)
- List of the Catholic dioceses of the United States
- Roman Catholic Marian churches
