= Geraldo Ramírez Torres =

His Excellency, The Most Reverend Geraldo Ramírez Torres
- Bishop of Ponce
- Diocese: Ponce
- Appointed: June 24, 2026
- Installed: August 15, 2026
- Predecessor: Rubén González Medina

Orders
- Ordination: November 19, 1991 by Juan Fremiot Torres Oliver
- Consecration: August 15, 2026 by Piergiorgio Bertoldi, Rubén González Medina, and Ángel Luis Ríos Matos

Personal details
- Born: November 17, 1967 (age 58) Villalba, Puerto Rico
- Education: Pontifical Catholic University of Puerto Rico
- Motto: Mane Nobiscum Domine
- Styles
- Reference style: His Excellency; The Most Reverend
- Spoken style: Your Excellency
- Religious style: Bishop

Geraldo Ramírez Torres (born November 17, 1967) is a Puerto Rican Catholic priest who serves as bishop of Ponce.

== Biography ==
In 1985, Torres entered the Major Seminary Regina Cleri of the Diocese of Ponce and got his bachelor's degree in Theology at the Pontifical Catholic University of Puerto Rico. He received his diaconal ordination on June 29, 1991, and was ordained a priest on November 19, 1991.

== Episcopal career ==
=== Diocese of Ponce ===
Pope Leo XIV appointed Torres bishop for the Diocese of Ponce on June 24, 2026. He was consecrated and installed on August 15, 2026.

== See also ==
- Catholic Church hierarchy
- Catholic Church in the United States
- Historical list of the Catholic bishops of the United States
- Historical list of the Catholic bishops of Puerto Rico
- List of Catholic bishops of the United States
- Lists of patriarchs, archbishops, and bishops

== Episcopal succession ==
Catholic Church titles
Preceded by Rubén González Medina	Bishop of Ponce; 2026-present	Succeeded by Incumbent
