= Félix Lázaro Martínez =

His Excellency, The Most Reverend Félix Lázaro Martínez Sch.P.
- Bishop Emeritus of Ponce
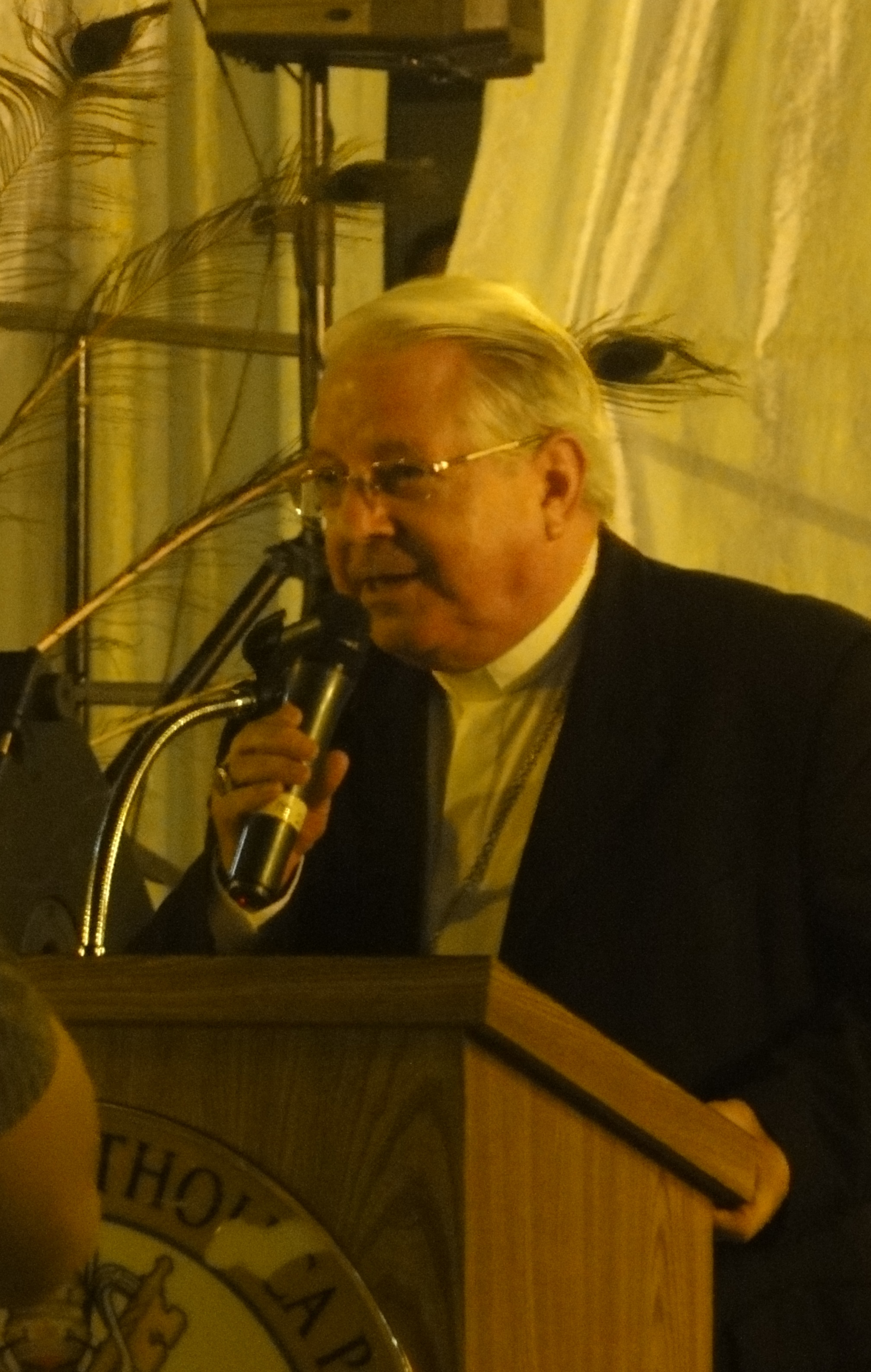
- Bishop Lázaro in 2012
- Archdiocese: San Juan
- Diocese: Ponce
- Appointed: 20 March 2002 (Coadjutor)
- Installed: 11 June 2003
- Retired: 22 December 2015
- Predecessor: Ricardo Antonio Suriñach Carreras
- Successor: Rubén González Medina
- Previous post: Coadjutor Bishop of Ponce (2002-2003)

Orders
- Ordination: 9 April 1961
- Consecration: 25 April 2002 by Ricardo Antonio Suriñach Carreras, Timothy Broglio, and Iñaki Mallona Txertudi

Personal details
- Born: 2 March 1936 (age 90) Logroño, La Rioja, Spain
- Motto: Bonitas justitia veritas (Goodness, justice, truth)

Styles of Félix Lázaro Martínez
- Reference style: His Excellency; The Most Reverend
- Spoken style: Your Excellency
- Religious style: Bishop

Félix Lázaro Martínez, Sch.P., (born 2 March 1936) is a Spanish-born prelate who served as the Bishop of the Roman Catholic Diocese of Ponce. Lázaro was ordained to serve as the Coadjutor Bishop of Ponce on 25 April 2002, and was elevated to bishop of the diocese on 11 June 2003. He retired on 22 December 2015 and was succeeded by Rubén González Medina, the Bishop of Caguas.

== Biography ==
=== Early life ===
Felix Lázaro was born in Logroño, La Rioja, Spain, on 2 March 1936. He entered the Piarist Fathers Order, who are dedicated to education. He was ordained a priest on 9 April 1961 by Bishop Ricardo Antonio Suriñach Carreras. In 1970, Lázaro was sent to teach at the Pontifical Catholic University of Puerto Rico in Ponce, Puerto Rico. He later became dean of the College of the Arts and Humanities of the university.

=== Coadjutor Bishop and Bishop of Ponce ===
Pope John Paul II appointed Lázaro as coadjutor bishop of the Diocese of Ponce on 20 March 2002. He was consecrated on 25 April 2002 by Bishop Suriñach. Upon the retirement of Suriñach on 11 June 2003, Lázaro automatically succeeded him as bishop.

On 12 December 2013, Lázaro was added to the list of illustrious Ponce citizens at a ceremony at the Park of the Illustrious Ponce Citizens in Tricentennial Park in Ponce.

On 22 December 2015, Pope Francis accepted Lázaro's resignation as bishop of Ponce.

== See also ==
- Catholic Church hierarchy
- Catholic Church in the United States
- Historical list of the Catholic bishops of Puerto Rico
- Historical list of the Catholic bishops of the United States
- List of Catholic bishops of the United States
- Lists of patriarchs, archbishops, and bishops

Catholic Church titles
Preceded by Ricardo Antonio Suriñach Carreras	Bishop of Ponce; 2003-2015	Succeeded by Rubén González Medina
Preceded by -	Coadjutor Bishop of Ponce; 2002-2003	Succeeded by -
