= Juan Fremiot Torres Oliver =

Puerto Rican prelate of the Catholic Church

- Bishop Emeritus of Ponce
- Church: Catholic
- Diocese: Ponce
- In office: 1964–2000
- Predecessor: Luis Aponte Martinez
- Successor: Ricardo Antonio Suriñach Carreras

Orders
- Ordination: 10 April 1950
- Consecration: 21 December 1964 by Cardinal Francis Spellman, Luis Aponte Martínez and Alfredo Méndez-Gonzalez

Personal details
- Born: 28 October 1925; San Germán, Puerto Rico
- Died: 26 January 2012 (aged 86); Ponce, Puerto Rico
- Buried: Cathedral of Our Lady of Guadalupe in Ponce, Puerto Rico
- Coat of arms

Juan Fremiot Torres Oliver (28 October 1925 – 26 January 2012) was a Puerto Rican prelate of the Catholic Church. He was the longest-serving bishop for the Diocese of Ponce in Ponce, Puerto Rico, with 36 years of service from 1964 to 2000.

== Priesthood and episcopacy ==
Torres Oliver was ordained priest in Ponce at age 24, on 10 April 1950. He was appointed bishop of Ponce on 4 November 1964 at age 39 and was consecrated on 21 December 1964. He retired as bishop of Ponce at age 75, on 10 November 2000, after a 36-year episcopate. He was a bishop emeritus of the diocese of Ponce.

From 1983 to 1994, Torres Oliver was president of the Conferencia Episcopal Puertorriqueña, CEP (Puerto Rican Episcopal Conference).

One of Torres Oliver's most controversial decisions was the one he made in early January 1974. At the death of Isabel la Negra he refused to admit her body into the Ponce Cathedral or to administer her the holy sacraments posthumously.

== Legacy ==
The School of Law at the Pontifical Catholic University of Puerto Rico is named after him.

== Death ==
Torres Oliver died in Ponce on 26 January 2012 at the age of 86. His death was the result of a heart attack. His remains will be rest at the Catedral Nuestra Señora de Guadalupe in Ponce.

Catholic Church titles
Preceded by Luis Aponte Martínez	Bishop of Ponce; 1964–2000	Succeeded by Ricardo Antonio Suriñach Carreras
