= Paul E. Waldschmidt =

American prelate of the Catholic Church (1920–1994)

Paul E. Waldschmidt CSC
- Auxiliary Bishop of Portland in Oregon
- Church: Catholic
- Archdiocese: Portland in Oregon
- In office: 1978–1990
- Other posts: Titular Bishop of Citium; (1978–1994); Auxiliary Bishop Emeritus of Portland in Oregon; (1990–1994)
- Previous posts: President, University of Portland (1962–1978); Member, Fellows of the University of Notre Dame; Member, Board of Trustees of the University of Notre Dame

Orders
- Ordination: June 24, 1944 by John Francis Noll
- Consecration: March 2, 1978 by Cornelius Michael Power; Co-consecrators: Elden Francis Curtiss; Alfredo Méndez-Gonzalez

Personal details
- Born: January 7, 1920 Evansville, Indiana, U.S.
- Died: October 20, 1994 (aged 74) Portland, Oregon, U.S.
- Buried: Holy Cross Community Cemetery, Notre Dame, Indiana
- Education: University of Notre Dame (1942)
- Coat of arms
- Awards: National Conference of Christians and Jews human relations award, 1979; First Citizen of Portland, 1984

Paul Edward Waldschmidt CSC (January 7, 1920 – October 20, 1994) was an American prelate of the Catholic Church who served as an auxiliary bishop of the Archdiocese of Portland in Oregon from 1978 to 1990.

== Biography ==
Born in Evansville, Indiana (U.S.), he graduated from the University of Notre Dame in 1942. Waldschmidt was ordained to the priesthood on June 24, 1944, for the Congregation of Holy Cross. From 1962 to 1978, Waldschmidt served as president of the University of Portland. In 1969, Waldschmidt was elected as a member of the board of trustees and as a member of the Fellows of the University of Notre Dame.

On November 28, 1977, he was appointed titular bishop of Citium and auxiliary bishop of the Archdiocese of Portland in Oregon. He was consecrated on March 2, 1978. Waldschmidt resigned on January 8, 1990.

In 1992, Waldschmidt Hall, the main administration building of the University of Portland, was named for the former president of the university.

He died on October 20, 1994.

Catholic Church titles
Preceded by –	Auxiliary Bishop of Portland in Oregon; 1978–1990	Succeeded by –
