= Alfredo Méndez-Gonzalez =

American prelate of the Catholic Church (1907–1995)

The Most Reverend Alfredo Méndez Gonzalez CSC
- Bishop of Arecibo
- Church: Catholic
- Diocese: Arecibo
- Appointed: July 23, 1960
- Term ended: January 21, 1974
- Predecessor: Office established
- Successor: Miguel Rodriguez Rodriguez, C.Ss.R.
- Other post: Bishop Emeritus of Arecibo (1974–1995)

Orders
- Ordination: June 24, 1935
- Consecration: October 28, 1960 by Francis Spellman

Personal details
- Born: June 3, 1907 Chicago, Illinois, U.S.
- Died: 28 January 1995 (aged 87) Cincinnati, Ohio, U.S.
- Buried: Catedral de San Felipe Apostol, Arecibo, Puerto Rico, U.S.
- Education: University of Notre Dame, U.S.
- Motto: Caritas (Charity)
- Coat of arms: Alfredo Méndez Gonzalez's coat of arms

Styles of Alfredo Méndez Gonzalez
- Reference style: His Excellency; The Most Reverend
- Spoken style: Your Excellency
- Religious style: Your Excellency

Ordination history of Alfredo Méndez-Gonzalez
History
Episcopal consecration
- Principal consecrator: Francis Spellman
- Co-consecrators: Edwin Byrne, Richard Henry Ackerman
Episcopal succession
Bishops consecrated by Alfredo Méndez-Gonzalez as principal consecrator
- Marcos Gregorio McGrath: 1961
- Juan Fremiot Torres Oliver: 1964
- Rafael Grovas Felix: 1965
- Miguel Rodriguez Rodriguez: 1974
- Paul Edward Waldschmidt: 1978
- Kenneth Donald Steiner: 1978
- Clarence Kelly, SSPV: 1993

Alfredo José Isaac Cecilio Francisco Méndez-Gonzalez CSC (June 3, 1907 – January 28, 1995) was an American Catholic bishop who served in Puerto Rico and who later became involved with sedevacantists.

== Biography ==
=== Early life ===
Alfredo Méndez-Gonzalez was born in Chicago, Illinois, United States, on June 3, 1907, of mixed Spanish and Puerto Rican ancestry. On June 23, he was baptized as "Alfredo José Isaac Cecilio". He took the name "Francisco" at his confirmation.

As a boy of about nine years old, he was tapped on the head by Saint Frances Xavier Cabrini, an elderly nun who came to the Mendez home to thank Mendez's mother for her work in supporting Catholic charities. Méndez said afterward that it was at that moment that he was tapped on the head by Cabrini that he knew he would become a priest. Méndez harbored a great devotion to her for the rest of his life.

=== Education ===
He attended school in New York, United States, and in Barcelona, Spain, and finished high school in Evansville, Indiana, United States. In 1925, he entered the postulancy of the Congregation of Holy Cross at Holy Cross seminary at the University of Notre Dame, Notre Dame, Indiana, and made his novitiate there in 1926 at Saint Joseph's Novitiate. In 1931, he graduated from the University of Notre Dame. He performed his theological studies at Holy Cross College of Catholic University of America in Washington, D.C.

=== Priesthood ===
On June 24, 1935, in Washington, D.C., Méndez was ordained a priest. He then returned to the University of Notre Dame for graduate studies.

In 1936, his religious superiors sent him to teach at St. Edward's University in Austin, Texas. As a priest in Austin, he devoted himself to Mexican immigrants (the Catholic Church in Mexico was suffering persecution during this time). He established parishes and built churches for them during the late 1930s and early 1940s.

in 1948. Later that year, he was transferred to the University of Notre Dame to assume administrative positions in there. In 1956, his religious superiors named him the first Director of Province Development for the Congregation of Holy Cross.

=== Episcopacy ===
On July 23, 1960, Pope John XXIII named Méndez the first bishop of Arecibo, Puerto Rico. He traveled to Rome for the Second Vatican Council, but fell ill with hepatitis upon arrival. He recovered only in time to attend the council's closing days. He is said to have been shocked upon his return and stated: "They're all Protestants!" On the other hand, it is also said that he stated that his big contribution to the council was his effort for a married diaconate.

On January 21, 1974, at the age of 66, after only 14 years of active service as a diocesan bishop, he resigned as Bishop of Arecibo and returned to California. Numerous diocesan bishops in the United States invited him to assist in their dioceses, but Méndez refused such invitations.

From his retirement, he had steady correspondence with the Vatican and with other bishops, urging the return of the traditional Latin Mass. He initially favored the creation of a separate "Traditional Latin Rite" with independent status similar to the Eastern Catholic rites, but abandoned that idea as unworkable. He then recommended and entertained the notion of some sort of Tridentine Ordinariate which, like the U.S. Military Ordinariate, would be independent of bishops throughout the world, but eventually judged that idea to be also unworkable.

Méndez wrote to the Vatican defending Marcel Lefebvre, who was criticized by the Vatican. In response, Cardinal Giovanni Benelli defended the Vatican's criticism of Lefebvre, stating that Lefebvre rejects Paul VI and the Second Vatican Council. Lefebvre thanked Méndez for his help and "courageous intervention to [the] Holy See."

In 1988, in California, Méndez was visited by Paul Baumberger and Joseph Greenwell, two former seminarians of the Society of Saint Pius X (SSPX) who were then associated with the Society of Saint Pius V (SSPV). They asked him to conduct priestly ordinations. Méndez encouraged them to find an active bishop who would ordain them. On April 25, 1990, Méndez asked Bishop Juan Fremiot Torres Oliver to supply a "canonical cover" (in Oliver's expression) for traditionalist priests. Oliver rejected his proposal. In July 1990, Méndez decided that he himself would ordain Baumberger and Greenwell without the necessary authorizations. The ordinations to the diaconate occurred on August 1, 1990, with about four dozen people present, including five priests. The ordinations to the priesthood occurred on September 3.

Méndez was a prominent, avid, and financial supporter of the television program "What Catholics Believe" of Father Clarence Kelly and Father William Jenkins (both priests of the SSPV). Méndez even invited Pat Buchanan to be a guest in the show.

On September 8, 1993, Méndez was visited by Kelly and Jenkins to ask him about the possibility of him consecrating a bishop, but before Kelly and Jenkins had a chance to ask him, Méndez himself proposed to Kelly to consecrate him a bishop. They discussed the question of excommunication at some length and talked about an interview with canon lawyer Count Neri Capponi that appeared in the May–June 1993 issue of The Latin Mass magazine, where Capponi expressed the view that Archbishop Lefebvre was not really excommunicated for the Écône consecrations. Méndez gave the whole matter further consideration. He then became ill and suffered pneumonia. He was rushed into the critical care unit (CCU). Jenkins arrived at the hospital in Vista, California, and administered the Sacrament of Extreme Unction and gave the Apostolic Benediction to Méndez, who then gradually but swiftly improved and recovered.

On October 19, 1993, in his private chapel in his home in Carlsbad, California, Méndez consecrated Kelly a bishop, in secret and without papal permission.

=== Death ===
In January 1995, the priests of the SSPV brought Méndez to Cincinnati to show him a church property they hoped he would buy for them. During the stay, Méndez became ill, suffered pancreatic tumor, and went into hospital. He died on January 28, 1995, at the age of 87.

At that week, Mendez's consecration of Kelly in 1993 was announced by the SSPV.

Catholic Church titles
New title	Bishop of Arecibo; 1960–1974	Succeeded by Miguel Rodriguez Rodriguez
