= Warwick New York Hotel =

Hotel in Manhattan, New York

Warwick New York
- Warwick New York (2026)

General information
- Type: Hotel
- Architectural style: Renaissance revival
- Location: 65 West 54th Street, New York, New York
- Coordinates: 40.76230°N 73.97824°W
- Construction started: 1925
- Completed: 1927
- Owner: Warwick Hotels and Resorts

Height
- Height: 110.64 m

Technical details
- Floor count: 36

Design and construction
- Architects: Emery Roth, George B. Post & Sons
- Developer: William Randolph Hearst

Other information
- Number of rooms: 426

The Warwick New York is a luxury hotel at 65 West 54th Street, on the northeastern corner with Sixth Avenue, in Midtown Manhattan, New York City. Constructed between 1925 and 1927, it is owned by Warwick Hotels and Resorts.

== Architecture ==
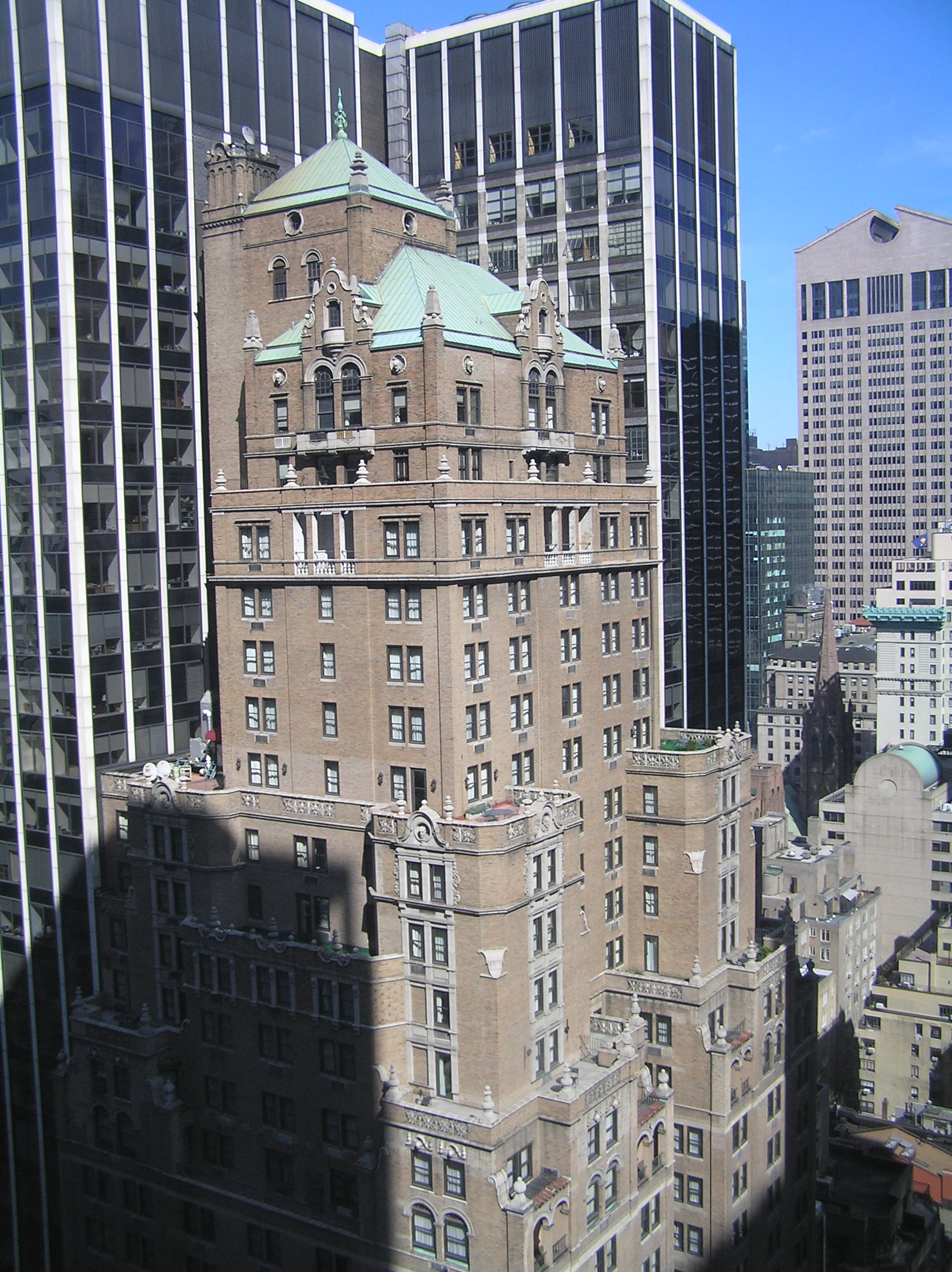
The top part of the building

The 36-floor Renaissance Revival building was designed by Emery Roth in association with the architectural firm of George B. Post & Sons. The hotel's three-story base is covered with limestone and granite. The brown brick superstructure has two wings projecting to the street from the property line. The wings set back several times, receding into the main slab—itself thinning into a top tower after further setbacks. The overall shape of the structure has a strong vertical thrust.

== History ==
William Randolph Hearst built the Warwick New York in 1926 for $5 million. Long catering to the elite, Hearst built the 36-story residential tower to accommodate his Hollywood friends as well as his mistress, the actress Marion Davies, who had her own specially designed floor in the building.

The hotel's restaurant, Murals on 54, features the 1937 murals of American illustrator Dean Cornwell. The famed murals were fully restored following a 2004 renovation of the restaurant. The Warwick is also home to Randolph's Bar & Lounge, whose rosebud motif references Hearst's purported nickname for Marion Davies.

The owner of the Warwick New York is Warwick Hotels and Resorts, which was founded in 1980 with the purchase of this hotel by its chairman, Richard Chiu.

In 1988, the Traditionalist Catholic congregation Daughters of Mary, Mother of Our Savior regularly performed a Tridentine Mass at the hotel each Sunday as part of their network of missions.

== Prominent guests ==
According to the Warwick Hotel website, James Dean, Jane Russell, Elizabeth Taylor, Meyer Lansky, and Elvis Presley were frequent guests, and Cary Grant lived there for 12 years. The Beatles stayed at the hotel during their 1965 and 1966 US tours.

In September 2011 and 2012, Iranian President Mahmoud Ahmadinejad and his delegation stayed at the Warwick for the UN General Assembly, which led to protests outside the hotel.

== In popular culture ==
In the Mad Men season 4 episode, "Hands and Knees", Lane Pryce's father stays at the Warwick Hotel when visiting New York in August 1965.
