= Ricardo Antonio Suriñach Carreras =

Catholic bishop

- Bishop of Ponce
- Church: Roman Catholicism
- See: Roman Catholic Diocese of Ponce
- In office: 2000 - 2003
- Predecessor: Juan Fremiot Torres Oliver
- Successor: Félix Lázaro Martinez

Orders
- Ordination: 13 April 1957
- Consecration: 30 November 2000 by Bishop Juan Fremiot Torres Oliver, Rafael Grovas Felix and Juan de Dios López de Victoria

Personal details
- Born: 1 April 1928 Mayagüez, Puerto Rico
- Died: 19 January 2005 (aged 76) Ponce, Puerto Rico
- Buried: Cementerio Las Mercedes in Ponce, Puerto Rico
- Education: Pontifical Catholic University of Puerto Rico; Pontifical University of Saint Thomas Aquinas; Fordham University

Ricardo Antonio Suriñach Carreras was bishop for the Roman Catholic Diocese of Ponce. Suriñach Carreras was ordained priest in Ponce on 13 April 1957. He was subsequently named bishop of Ponce in 2000 by Pope John Paul II. Suriñach Carreras was a university professor, advisor and lecturer prior to becoming bishop.

== Life ==
Suriñach Carreras was born in Mayagüez, Puerto Rico, on 1 April 1928. He obtained his B.A. degree from the Pontifical Catholic University of Puerto Rico. He subsequently completed his theological training at the Pontifical University of Saint Thomas Aquinas, and completed a Ph.D. in Counseling Education from Fordham University. He served as chaplain in the Puerto Rico National Guard from 1960 till 1974. Made officer level in 1962 at the U.S. Army Chaplain School at Fort Slocum. He completed advance officer training course in 1965.

== Priesthood ==
Ordained priest on April 13, 1957. Elected Auxiliary Bishop of Ponce on May 26, 1975. Ordained on July 25, 1975. Elected Bishop of Ponce on November 10 and installed on November 30, 2000. Retired on June 11, 2003 and became Bishop Emeritus of Ponce since. Passed away in Ponce on January 19, 2005 at the age of 76.

== Episcopal succession ==
Catholic Church titles
Preceded by Juan Fremiot Torres Oliver	Bishop of Ponce; 2000-2003	Succeeded by Félix Lázaro Martinez
Preceded by -	Auxiliary Bishop of Ponce; 1975-2000	Succeeded by -
