= Society of Saint Pius V =

Sedevacantist society of priests

- Societas Sacerdotalis Sancti Pii Quinti
- Abbreviation: SSPV
- Formation: 1983
- Type: Traditionalist Catholic religious congregation
- Headquarters: Norwood, Ohio, United States
- Superior General: William Jenkins
- Key people: Clarence Kelly; Daniel Dolan; Anthony Cekada; Eugene Berry; Donald Sanborn; Thomas Zapp; William Jenkins; Joseph Collins; Martin Skierka
- Website: sspv.org

The Society of Saint Pius V (SSPV; Latin: Societas Sacerdotalis Sancti Pii Quinti) is a traditionalist Catholic society of priests, formed in 1983, and based in Norwood, Ohio, United States. The society's original headquarters was in Oyster Bay Cove, New York. The society was formed by a group of priests who broke away from the Society of Saint Pius X (SSPX) over liturgical issues.

The SSPV is sedevacantist, believing that the papacy has been vacant since the death of Pope Pius XII. The society was headed by one of its co-founders, Bishop Clarence Kelly, until his death on December 2, 2023. It is named after Pope Pius V, who promulgated the Tridentine Mass.

== History ==
=== Founding ===
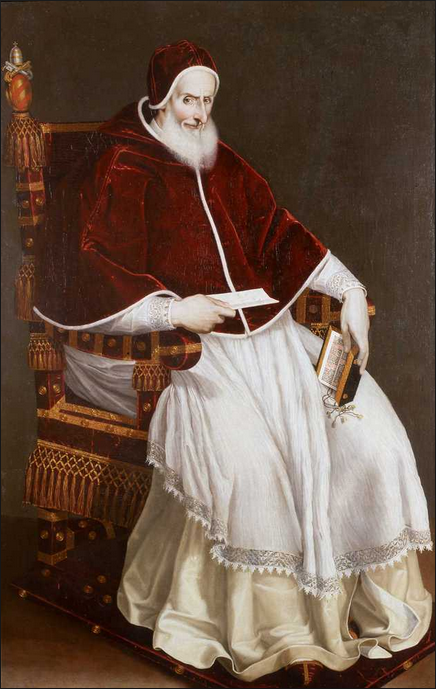
Pope Pius V, after whom the society is named

Four expelled priests plus five who voluntarily left the SSPX refused to accept Lefebvre's insistence on the 1962 Missal, as it was their opinion that it included departures from the liturgical traditions of the church (for example, inserting the name of Saint Joseph after that of the Blessed Virgin Mary in the Canon of the Mass). According to the now-Bishop Donald Sanborn (one of the nine priests), Lefebvre was imposing these liturgical and disciplinary changes in view of a reconciliation with the Vatican. A more basic reason was the belief amongst the nine that the claimants to the Papacy since the death of Pope Pius XII (d. 1958) had not been legitimate popes (Canon 1325, no. 2, 1917), although Fr. Anthony Cekada later stated that "[t]he 'pope question' was not raised at the time, and was not at issue." They held that these Vatican II claimants to the Papacy had officially taught and/or accepted heretical doctrines, and therefore had lost or never occupied the See of Rome.

=== Splits ===
Cekada states that a split took place in the SSPV, which resulted from the SSPV's intrinsic distrust of a centralized authority as existed in the SSPX, which makes the latter vulnerable to being "subverted with one stroke of a pen" to the Vatican. Rather than independent congregations being a weakness and something to be lamented, Cekada considers all such groups and priests taken together preferable to the SSPX, which has continued to hold negotiations with Rome and uses the 1962 Missal.

=== Episcopal orders ===
On 19 October 1993, Clarence Kelly was consecrated a bishop in Carlsbad, California, United States, by Bishop Alfredo Méndez-Gonzalez, the retired Bishop of Arecibo, Puerto Rico.

== Structures ==
The SSPV currently has five permanent priories, and its priests serve a network of chapels, churches, and temporary Mass locations in 14 US states (as of 2023) and one Canadian province (Alberta).

=== Superiors general ===
- Clarence Kelly (1983–2023)
- William Jenkins (2024–)

=== Associated religious communities ===
The Congregation of Saint Pius V (CSPV) is a Society of Common Life for priests and coadjutor brothers, founded by Bishop Kelly in 1996. The CSPV was formed to provide a canonical structure for the incardination of priests and the affiliation of religious. The congregation operates Immaculate Heart Seminary in Round Top, New York, for its candidates, under the direction of Bishop James Carroll, CSPV. The seminary's graduates are ordained by Bishop Carroll or Bishop Santay. As of 2025, the CSPV has two bishops, fifteen priests, and four brothers.
