= Anthony Cekada =

American sedevacantist priest, author (1951–2020)

The Reverend Father Anthony Cekada
- Church: Saint Gertrude the Great

Orders
- Ordination: 29 June 1977 by Marcel Lefebvre

Personal details
- Born: July 18, 1951 San Diego, California, US
- Died: September 11, 2020 (aged 69) West Chester Township, Ohio, US
- Denomination: Traditionalist Catholic; Sedevacantist
- Occupation: Priest; author
- Education: The International Seminary of Saint Pius X, Écône, Switzerland

Anthony John Cekada (July 18, 1951 – September 11, 2020) was an American sedevacantist Catholic priest and author.

== Biography ==
=== Early life ===
Cekada was born to a Slovenian-Italian family as a third-generation American. He was raised in Milwaukee where his father worked as a chauffeur for the Schlitz family of Joseph Schlitz Brewing Company. His mother died of cancer when he was 12 years old. After graduating high school in 1969, Cekada began studying at St. Francis Roman Catholic Seminary College in Milwaukee where he "immediately began a one-man protest against ... theological and liturgical modernism" before graduating with a bachelor's degree in Theology in 1973; he studied organ and musical composition at the Wisconsin Conservatory of Music.

=== SSPX ===
In 1975, after two years as a Cistercian monk, he entered International Seminary of Saint Pius X in Écône, Switzerland, joined the Society of St. Pius X, completed his studies, and was ordained to the priesthood by Archbishop Marcel Lefebvre in 1977.

Following his sacerdotal ordination, Cekada taught seminarians at St. Joseph's House of Studies, Armada, Michigan, and St. Thomas Aquinas Seminary, Ridgefield, Connecticut.

From 1979 to 1989 he resided in Oyster Bay Cove, New York, where he did pastoral and administrative work, and edited the traditionalist publication The Roman Catholic.

=== SSPV ===
In 1983 Cekada, along with eight other priests, broke with the Society of St. Pius X (SSPX) over various theological and liturgical issues and several years later formed the Society of St. Pius V (SSPV), headed by then Fr. Clarence Kelly.

=== Later activities and death ===
In 1989 Cekada left the SSPV and he moved to West Chester, where he assisted with pastoral work at St. Gertrude the Great, a Traditionalist Catholic Church. Cekada was a well-known and convinced sedevacantist, believing the popes of the Second Vatican Council to have been invalid pontiffs.

Once a month during the academic year, Cekada traveled to Brooksville, Florida where he taught Canon Law, Liturgy, and Scripture.

He died on September 11, 2020, in West Chester, Ohio. He was 69 years old.

== Authorship ==
He had devoted a considerable amount of time to research and writing. TAN Books published two of his works criticizing the post-Vatican II liturgical reform. One was a commentary and new translation for The Ottaviani Intervention, a key document in the traditionalist movement. The other, The Problems with the Prayers of the Modern Mass, argues that the 1969 Roman Missal systematically omits Catholic doctrines (e.g. the uniqueness of the Church); it has been translated into at least four languages.

Cekada had written two introductory booklets for newcomers to the Traditional Mass which were published by St. Gertrude the Great Church.

Cekada's bibliography includes apologetic, analytical and controversial articles on a great variety of topics: the errors of Vatican II and the post-Conciliar popes, canon law, seminary formation, the Feeney case, the Mass of Paul VI, the pre-Vatican II liturgical changes, the validity of post Vatican II sacramental rites, questions in moral and pastoral theology, and the case for sedevacantism, the Schiavo case, the Society of St. Pius X, intramural traditionalist disputes, and rubrical matters.

In 2010 Cekada completed Work of Human Hands: A Theological Critique of the Mass of Paul VI, a 468-page study of the post-Vatican II liturgical reform published by Philothea Press which argues the new rite permits “irrelevance” and “destroys Catholic doctrine concerning [...] the Real Presence". Unusually for a publication by a prominent sedevacantist, the book received praise from mainstream Catholic reviewers.
