= Round Top, New York =

- Hamlet and CDP
- Location within New York Location within the United States
- Coordinates: 42°16′08″N 74°01′38″W
- Country: United States
- State: New York
- County: Greene
- Town: Cairo
- Elevation: 604 ft (184 m)

Population (2024)
  - Total: 920
- Time zone: UTC-5 (Eastern (EST))
  - Summer (DST): UTC-4 (EDT)
- ZIP code: 12473
- Area codes: 518 & 838
- GNIS feature ID: 963015

Round Top is a hamlet (and census-designated place) in the town of Cairo in Greene County, New York, United States. As of the 2020 census, Round Top had a population of 920. It is 9.1 miles (14.6 km) west-northwest of Catskill. The hamlet has a post office with ZIP code 12473, which opened on January 3, 1910.
