= Chiquito de Cibao River =

River of Puerto Rico

Coordinates: 18.3668935°N 66.9054550°W

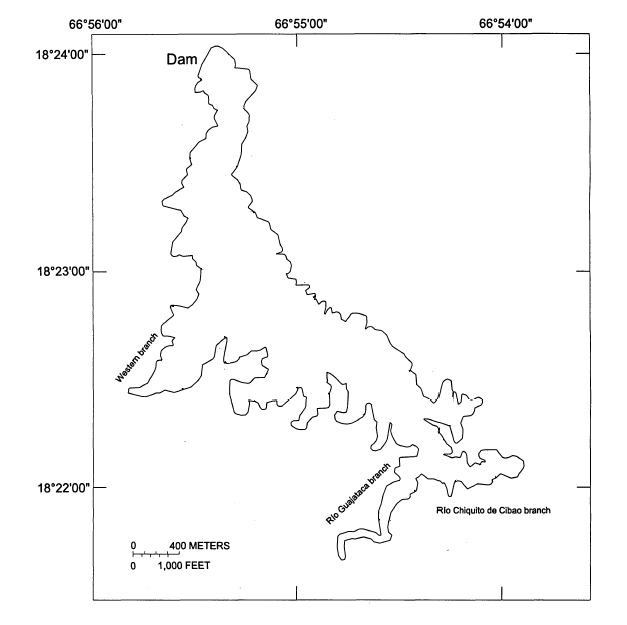
- Map of the mouth of Chiquito de Cibao River in relation to Guajataca Lake
- Etymology: "small river of Cibao" in Spanish, Cibao meaning "rocky" in Taíno.
- Native name: Río Chiquito de Cibao (Spanish)

Location
- Commonwealth: Puerto Rico
- Municipality: Lares, Camuy, San Sebastián

Physical characteristics
- Source
  - location: Boundary between Piletas, Lares and Cibao, Camuy.
- Mouth
  - location: Guajataca River at Guajataca Lake in Cibao, San Sebastián
  - elevation: 633 ft. (192.94 m)

The Chiquito de Cibao River (Spanish: Río Chiquito de Cibao) is a tributary of the Guajataca River which goes through the municipalities of Lares, Camuy, and San Sebastián in Puerto Rico. It is one of the main tributaries that feed the Guajataca Lake.

== See also ==
- List of rivers of Puerto Rico
