= Yokahu Lodge =

Order of the Arrow Lodge of the Puerto Rico Council of Scouting America

- Yokahu Lodge flap
- Totem: Three-Point Taíno Cemí
- Owner: Puerto Rico Council
- Age range: 14–20 (youth); 21 and over (adults)
- Headquarters: Puerto Rico Council Guaynabo, Puerto Rico; Guajataka Scout Reservation San Sebastián, Puerto Rico
- Location: Puerto Rico
- Founded: April 10–15, 1954 (72 years ago)
- Founders: Luis Matías Ferrer; Dr. Frank H. Wadsworth
- Membership: 202 youth 70 young adults 166 adults 438 total (2021)
- Lodge Chief: Sebastián Y. Rosado–González
- Affiliation: Order of the Arrow; Scouting America (Note: Formerly Boy Scouts of America, as of February 8, 2025.)

Yokahu Lodge 506 is the Order of the Arrow lodge of the Puerto Rico Council of Scouting America, serving all municipalities of Puerto Rico. It was founded at Guajataka Scout Reservation, next to Guajataca Lake in San Sebastián, between April 10–15, 1954 by Luis Matías Ferrer and Dr. Frank H. Wadsworth. Yokahu Lodge's executive operation is based at the Puerto Rico Council offices in Guaynabo, while their field operations are at Guajataka Scout Reservation. The Lodge adopted the Three-Point Taíno Cemí as its totem and Yukiyú as its name, the latter which was eventually changed to Yokahu as a proposition by Dr. Ricardo Alegría. At National level, the Lodge is part of the Eastern Region, Section E-17.

== History ==
In 1953, the very first delegation of Scouts from the Puerto Rico Council attended the National Scout Jamboree at Irving Ranch, California. Among the activities, the delegation witnessed in awe an Order of the Arrow (OA) ceremony that caught the attention of its adults. Having the ceremony concluded, they approached the OA members and asked them about the ceremony and its meanings. Upon the delegation's return to Puerto Rico, the idea of the Order of the Arrow was taken to the Puerto Rico Council.

With the necessary requirements in hand provided by the OA National Office, the council tasked the founding of the Order of the Arrow in Puerto Rico to its executive Luis Matías Ferrer in 1954. Having no knowledge of the organization, he sought the help of Dr. Frank H. Wadsworth, an American forester who had been inducted in the Order of the Arrow during his youth in the United States, and was also the only Arrowman in Puerto Rico at the time. The first Ordeal ceremony took place April 10–15, 1954 at Guajataka Scout Reservation with Dr. Wadsworth acting as the first Ordealmaster. Because of his role in the first Ordeal ceremony, Wadsworth has been often recognized as the Yokahu Lodge's main, or sometimes sole, founder throughout its history with not enough credit given to Luis Matías Ferrer.

After the establishment of the Order of the Arrow in Puerto Rico, the Lodge was named Yukiyú and was later renamed to Yokahu, a variant of the name proposed by archaeologist, anthropologist and historian, Dr. Ricardo Alegría. In the beginning, the Lodge translated the ceremony scripts from English to Spanish and used Native American regalia, but decided later to slightly modify the ceremonies by assimilating the Taíno heritage with the Lenni Lennape culture, incorporating Taíno-based regalia and adapting the scripts to the Taíno culture. Yokahu Lodge is the only Order of the Arrow Lodge that uses Spanish as its main language.

When Yokahu Lodge was founded, it also covered the United States Virgin Islands when the Puerto Rico Council was previously known as the Puerto Rico and Virgin Islands Council. A chapter for the Virgin Islands, Chapter Arawak, was created to support them until they separated and created the Virgin Islands Council and Arawak Lodge 562 in 1965.

== Headquarters ==
The Lodge's office headquarters, where lodge, section and national business are managed, are within the Puerto Rico Council while field headquarters are at Guajataka Scout Reservation, considered as the official home of Yokahu Lodge. Most of the Lodge activities are celebrated in the camp where the Order of the Arrow has provided service to the facilities for many years. The OA has its own campsite, called "The Cabin", which occupancy has been discontinued due to structural damages, but still remains standing. In the past, the Paquito Joglar campsite area was considered the official gathering place for the Lodge, later becoming a campers area due to the need of space for the many Scouts that attended camp.

== Lodge Chiefs and Chapters ==
The term for Yokahu's Lodge Chiefs runs for a year, after each election. From the Lodge's foundation in 1954, the Lodge Chief term began in the middle of the year, until the term was changed to run from the beginning to the end of each year, as of 1972. Since then, the Lodge has had over sixty Lodge Chiefs, many who have had professional careers in politics, television, law firms, courts of law, medicine, etc., such as Héctor Luis Acevedo, former mayor of San Juan, and Alfred D. Herger, television host and psychologist.

Yokahu Lodge Chiefs timeline
No.	Chief	Term	Chapter	Unit
67	Sebastián Y. Rosado–González	2026	Guarionex	2815
66	Yénesis Y. O'Neill-Quiñones	2025	Majagua	12
65	Víctor D. Padilla-Rivera	2025	Yagüeka	39
65	Víctor D. Padilla-Rivera	2024	Yagüeka	39
64	Julián Calderón-Pérez	2023	Guaitiao	154
63	Sebastián Matos-Medina	2022	Guaitiao	154
62	Laura V. Díaz-Piferrer	2021	Yagüeka	39
61	Jorge A. Rivera-López	2020	Guaitiao	154
61	Jorge A. Rivera-López	2019	Guaitiao	154
60	Edward Colberg-Avilés	2018	Majagua	12
59	Douglas Soto-Ocasio	2017	Arasibo	822
58	Ricardo Calzada-Preston	2016	Yagüeka	162
57	Roberto E. Vélez-Rodríguez	2015	Guaitiao	685
56	José A. Molinelli-González	2014	Guaní	1167
55	Mario A. Velázquez-Fernández	2013	Guaní	1167
54	Angel J. Carrillo	2012	Guaní	247
53	Brayan G. Deida-Galeano	2011	Guaitiao	360
52	Manuel A. Díaz-Arzola	2010	Yagüeka	39
52	Manuel A. Díaz-Arzola	2009	Yagüeka	39
51	Carmelo Pagán	2008	Guarionex	49
50	William Joglar-Medina	2007	Guaitiao	154
49	José R. Guzmán-Pereira	2006	Guarionex	514
48	Martín Soto	2005	Yagüeka	270
47	Miguel "Choki" Rivera-Rivera	2004	Guaní	247
46	Angel M. Velázquez-Fernández	2003	Guaní	1167
45	José E. Castro	2002	Guarionex	49
44	Antonio Juan Barbosa	2001	Guaní	219
43	Nelson J. Díaz-Hernández	2000	Cayniabón (Note: Prior to 2018, Chapter Cayniabón covered Canóvanas, Carolina, Fajardo, Loíza, Luquillo and Río Grande.)	572
42	Orlando Lugo-Pérez	1999	Cayniabón	572
41	Alexander Fontanez	1998	Majagua	408
40	José Antonetti-Pagán	1997	Guarionex	
40	José Antonetti-Pagán	1996	Guarionex	
39	Juan Francisco Rosario-Riefkohl	1995	Guaraka (Note: Prior to 2018, Chapter Guaraka covered Ceiba, Culebra, Humacao, Juncos, Las Piedras, Maunabo, Naguabo, Patillas, San Lorenzo, Vieques and Yabucoa.)	32
38	Juan Arnaldo Ortiz-Cotto	1994	Guaní	247
37	Juan J. "Popeye" López-Ríos	1993	Majagua	553
36	Miguel Maldonado	1992	Guaitiao	377
35	Edgar A. "Gardy" González-Moreno	1991	Guarionex	424
34	Luis R. "Jun" González-Medina	1990	Yagüeka	166
33	Antonio "Tony" Fernandez-Santiago	1989	Majagua	237
33	Antonio "Tony" Fernandez-Santiago	1988	Majagua	237
32	Angel L. "Ozzy" Rodríguez	1987	Guaitiao	572
31	Rafael Fernández-Santiago	1986	Majagua	237
30	Rubén Sandoval-Ramos	1985	Majagua	583
29	Ubaldo Soto-González	1984	Arasibo	
28	José A. Kareh-Cordero	1983	Guaní	167
27	Eladio J. Feliciano-Matos	1982	Majagua	814
26	Edwin González	1981	Majagua	327
25	Juan A. Cornier	1980	Guaitiao	
24	Juan R. "Raymond" Nieves-Bonilla	1979	Guarionex	96
23	Luis R. Medina-Martínez	1978	Guaní	167
22	José Luis "JL" González	1977	Majagua	327
21	Víctor J. "Vitín" Linares-Ortiz	1976	Guarionex	96
20	Roberto J. "Bobby" Hernández	1975	Guaitiao	
19	José Francisco O'Neil	1974	Guaitiao	
18	Juan Lorenzo Martínez-Colón	1973	Guaitiao	
17	Edgardo "Gardo" Verdejo-Calderón	1971-72	Guaitiao	577
16	Erick Montalvo	1970-71	Guaitiao	46
15	Freddie Martínez	1969-70		
14	José A. "Beco" Zayas	1968-69	Guaitiao	46
13	Juan B. González	1967-68	Guaitiao	46
12	Héctor Luis Acevedo	1966-67	Guaitiao	
11	José A. "Pepe" Goyco-Larazabal	1965-66	Guaitiao	
10	Jorge A. Camacho-Vega	1964-65	Guaitiao	34
9	Angel A. Amy	1963-64		
8	Hipólito "Polo" Bravo	1962-63	Guaitiao	34
7	José Adolfo Morales	1961-62		
6	Francisco A. León	1960-61		
5	Alfred D. Herger	1959-60	Guaitiao	11
4	Raúl Iñesta-Quiñonez	1958-59	Guaitiao	11
3	Luis R. Pérez	1957-58		
2	José A. Méndez	1956-57		
1	Rafael Maldonado-Angulo	1955-56	Guaitiao	11
1	Rafael Maldonado-Angulo	1954-55	Guaitiao	11

Throughout its history, Yokahu Lodge has been composed of varying numbers of chapters. More or fewer chapters were created or merged with others to adapt to changes in their membership and in the national and local regulations of Scouting America and the Order of the Arrow. There have been a total of nine chapters that have existed at different times in the Lodge's history: Arasibo, Arawak, Cayniabón, Guaitiao, Guaní, Guaraka, Guarionex, Majagua and Yagüeka. Chapter Arawak, which covered the United States Virgin Islands since 1954, separated from Yokahu to form Arawak Lodge with the establishment of the Virgin Islands Council in 1965, leaving eight chapters remaining.

At the beginning of 2018, two of the eight chapters that formed Yokahu Lodge, Guaraka and Cayniabón, were merged to Chapters Guaní and Guaitiao, respectively, to align with the same number of districts of the Puerto Rico Council. In June 2026, another restructure was enacted, merging the remaining six chapters into three super-chapters: Majagua (Note: Barranquitas, Bayamón, Cataño, Corozal, Dorado, Naranjito, Toa Alta, Toa Baja and Vega Alta.) with Guaitiao, (Note: Canóvanas, Carolina, Fajardo, Guaynabo, Loíza, Luquillo, Río Grande, San Juan and Trujillo Alto.) Guarionex (Note: Adjuntas, Arroyo, Coamo, Guayama, Guayanilla, Jayuya, Juana Díaz, Peñuelas, Ponce, Salinas, Santa Isabel, Villalba, and Yauco.) with Guaní (Note: Aguas Buenas, Aibonito, Caguas, Cayey, Ceiba, Cidra, Comerío, Culebra, Gurabo, Humacao, Juncos, Las Piedras, Maunabo, Naguabo, Patillas, San Lorenzo, Vieques and Yabucoa.) and Yagüeka (Note: Aguada, Aguadilla, Añasco, Cabo Rojo, Guánica, Hormigueros, Isabela, Lajas, Las Marías, Maricao, Mayagüez, Moca, Rincón, Sabana Grande, San Germán and San Sebastián.) with Arasibo. (Note: Arecibo, Barceloneta, Camuy, Ciales, Florida, Hatillo, Lares, Manatí, Morovis, Orocovis, Quebradillas, Utuado and Vega Baja.)

The name of each chapter corresponds to words or names from the Taíno language. Arasibo, Guarionex and Majagua are named after caciques who ruled the territory where each chapter is located in. Cayniabón, Guaraka and Yagüeka are named after the Taíno name of each of their chapter's territories. Guaní and Guaitiao mean "golden disk that identifies the Cacique" and "friendship", respectively. Finally, the former Arawak Chapter took its name from the Arawak people, in which, the Taínos formed an important part.

The current chapters are: (Note: As of June 2026.)

- Chapter 1: (Note: Merger of Chapters Majagua and Guaitiao.)Barranquitas, Bayamón, Canóvanas, Carolina, Cataño, Comerío, Corozal, Dorado, Guaynabo, Loíza, Luquillo, Naranjito, Río Grande, San Juan, Toa Alta, Toa Baja, Trujillo Alto and Vega Alta.
- Chapter 2: (Note: Merger of Chapters Guarionex and Guaní.) Adjuntas, Aguas Buenas, Aibonito, Arroyo, Caguas, Cayey, Ceiba, Cidra, Coamo, Culebra, Fajardo, Guánica, Guayama, Guayanilla, Gurabo, Humacao, Jayuya, Juana Díaz, Juncos, Las Piedras, Maunabo, Naguabo, Patillas, Peñuelas, Ponce, Salinas, San Lorenzo, Santa Isabel, Vieques, Villalba, Yabucoa, and Yauco.
- Chapter 3: (Note: Merger of Chapters Yagüeka and Arasibo.) Aguada, Aguadilla, Añasco, Arecibo, Barceloneta, Cabo Rojo, Camuy, Ciales, Florida, Hatillo, Hormigueros, Isabela, Lajas, Lares, Las Marías, Maricao, Mayagüez, Manatí, Moca, Morovis, Orocovis, Quebradillas, Rincón, Sabana Grande, San Germán, San Sebastián, Utuado and Vega Baja.

== Activities ==
=== Main ===
There are four main activities in the Lodge's calendar. The Retorno is celebrated on a weekend between March and April; its purpose is to reunite the Lodge's Arrowmen to lay out and distribute the year's activities and the chapters in charge of running each one, it also serves as a chance to meet the new Lodge Executive Board for the year. Halfway through the year, the Lodge celebrates its high adventure activity between August and September, in order to challenge each Arrowmen's outdoor skills. In October, the Lodge celebrates its Guateke (from the Taíno language, meaning gathering), a fellowship event in which chapters participate in various competitions such as ceremony, regalia, dialogue, sports, triathlon and trivia; the highlight of the Guateke is the youth nominations for the positions of the Lodge Executive Board during the Fall Assembly. Finally in December, the annual Convention serves as the conclusion of the Lodge's year, similar to a "Court of Honor", in which different recognitions and awards are handed out based on service during the year and the youth elections for the executive board are held.

Other activities include the start-of-the-year Lodge Leadership Seminar followed by the First Executive Meeting, both taking place the same day early January, the Second Executive Meeting between March and April, the third and final Executive Meeting between late August and early September and a service project.

=== Inductions ===
Inductions are celebrated four times a year, usually once a month from May to August. The induction weekends are called Ordeal/Bros, which began in 1993, since both Ordeal and Brotherhood ceremonies take place at the same time. The Vigil Honor is celebrated as an independent activity from Saturday evening to midday Sunday on the weekend of Thanksgiving, strictly open to Vigil Honor members and candidates.

=== Section Conclaves ===
Since 2008, Yokahu Lodge has hosted three Section Conclaves at Guajataka Scout Reservation

The 2008 NE-2A Section Conclave marked the first time that the Yokahu Lodge hosted such event and the first to be held outside the United States. The event had a record attendance of 500 Arrowmen including the National Chief and Vice-Chief, Northeast Region Chief and many Section Chiefs. In this Conclave, the Section changed from NE-2A to NE-5A with the Section losing and acquiring other Lodges. At this event, Alberto del Valle, from Yokahu Lodge, became the second Puerto Rican to become a Section officer after being elected Section Vice-Chief. The first Yokahu Arrowman to become a Section officer was Fernando Moreno, who was elected Section Secretary, years prior.

In August 2016, Yokahu hosted the NE-5A Section Conclave for the second time, with more than 350 people from New Jersey and Puerto Rico attending the event, including the Order of the Arrow's National Chief, Northeast Region Chief and NE-5B Section Chief (also, NE-5 Section Co-Chief). In this Conclave, the outgoing Section Chief, Rodrigo Córdova, from Yokahu Lodge, who became the third Puerto Rican to become a Section officer, passed on his position to Christian Wolpert Gaztambide, another fellow Yokahu Arrowman, who was also elected as Section Chief of NE-5A and, subsequently, NE-5 Section Co-Chief. He became the fourth Puerto Rican to become a Section officer, the second to become Section Chief and the first back-to-back for the same position for a Yokahu Arrowman. This Conclave marked the final one as Section NE-5A before its merger with NE-5B to form one NE-5, acquiring an additional six Lodges to the five that NE-5A already had.

In August 2025, Yokahu hosted the Section Conclave for the third time, as part of the new Eastern Region, Section E-17, with the Order of the Arrow National Chief in attendance, as well as other Section Chiefs from the organization. In this Conclave, Yokahu Lodge Chief Víctor Padilla Rivera became the third Yokahu Arrowman to be elected Section Chief, and the fifth to become a Section officer. This also marks the first time that an incumbent Yokahu Lodge Chief is elected as a Section officer.

=== National Leadership Seminar ===
Yokahu Lodge has hosted the Order of the Arrow's National Leadership Seminar (NLS) three times for their membership. The first time was in 2002, which included visits from the National Chief and Northeast Region Chief, and again in 2014, which included visits from the Northeast Region Chief and the National Vice-Chief. Yokahu hosted the National Leadership Seminar for the third time in 2024.

== Awards ==
The Lodge has its own recognitions for distinguished service to the Lodge. The Cemí de Bronce (English: Bronze Cemí) is awarded to youth, while the Premio del Alegre Servicio (English: Cheerful Service Award), also known as the Three W's, which consists of three pins with the letter W on each one, is awarded to adults. Like the Vigil Honor, these awards are not earned by a set of requirements, but instead are awarded on a specific criteria set by a recognitions committee composed of youth Arrowmen. These awards have their own quota and are given during the convention.

Yokahu Lodge co-founder Dr. Frank H. Wadsworth is the Lodge's only recipient of the Distinguished Service Award, awarded in 1965 in recognition of his service to the Order of the Arrow. The Lodge was recipient of the Journey To Excellence Gold Award for the first time in 2013.

== Media ==
Yokahu Lodge publishes a newsletter named El Cemí, established by a young Alfred D. Herger shortly after the foundation of the Lodge. It is named after the Lodge totem and is traditionally published four times a year on March, September, October and December. In January 2012, the Lodge launched their official Facebook and Twitter accounts, integrating the era of social media to their communications and establishing efficient interactions with their Arrowmen. In January 2013, the Lodge created their Instagram account and, later, Snapchat in August 2015. The publication, social platforms and email are all managed between the chairman of the communications committee and the Lodge secretary, with assistance from the adult advisers.

== See also ==
- Order of the Arrow
- Scouting in Puerto Rico
