= Francisco "Paquito" Joglar Herrero =

Puerto Rican civic leader (1922–1957)

Francisco Joglar Herrero
- Born: May 12, 1922; Corozal, Puerto Rico
- Died: October 5, 1957 (aged 35); Bayamón, Puerto Rico
- Burial place: Puerto Rico National Cemetery
- Other names: Paquito Joglar
- Occupation(s): Medical technologist (US Army, WWII); Civic leader
- Years active: 1940s–1957
- Organization(s): Boy Scouts of America; Lions Club International; Vaqueros de Bayamón
- Spouse: Elsa Pesquera Umpierre (m. 1947)
- Awards: Silver Beaver Award
- Honors: Paquito Joglar Cabin (posthumous)

Francisco "Paquito" Joglar Herrero (May 12, 1922 – October 5, 1957) was a Puerto Rican medical technologist who served in the United States Army during World War II and later became a civic leader.

== Early life and career ==
Francisco Joglar Herrero, nicknamed "Paquito", was born on May 12, 1922, in the town of Corozal, Puerto Rico. His parents were Francisco Joglar Rodriguez and Angelina Herrero Calderón. At an early age, his family moved to the city of Bayamón, Puerto Rico where he attended elementary as well as high school. He served in the United States Army in the Medical Department during World War II with the rank of Technician fourth grade. In 1947, Francisco Joglar married Elsa Pesquera Umpierre.

Early on, he distinguished himself as a community and civic leader in various organizations such as the Lions Club, Colonia Hispanoamericana, the Catholic Church and the Vaqueros de Bayamón fan club. He was a founding member of the Alpha Chi Beta fraternity Bayamón chapter. He worked with the Boy Scouts of America Puerto Rico Council, serving as founding member of the Order of the Arrow chapter in Puerto Rico. For his service to the BSA, he was honored with the Silver Beaver Award.

== Death ==
He died on October 5, 1957 in a car accident and is buried at the Puerto Rico National Cemetery in Bayamón, Puerto Rico.

== Posthumous honors ==
In his honor, a street in Bayamón is named after him. An oil painting portrait of Francisco Joglar Herrero is on permanent display at the "Galeria de Bayamoneses Ilustres" at the Interamerican University of Puerto Rico Bayamon Campus. The "Paquito Joglar" cabin in Puerto Rico's Guajataka Scout Reservation was named after him.
