= Cibao, San Sebastián, Puerto Rico =

Barrio of Puerto Rico

Cibao
- Barrio
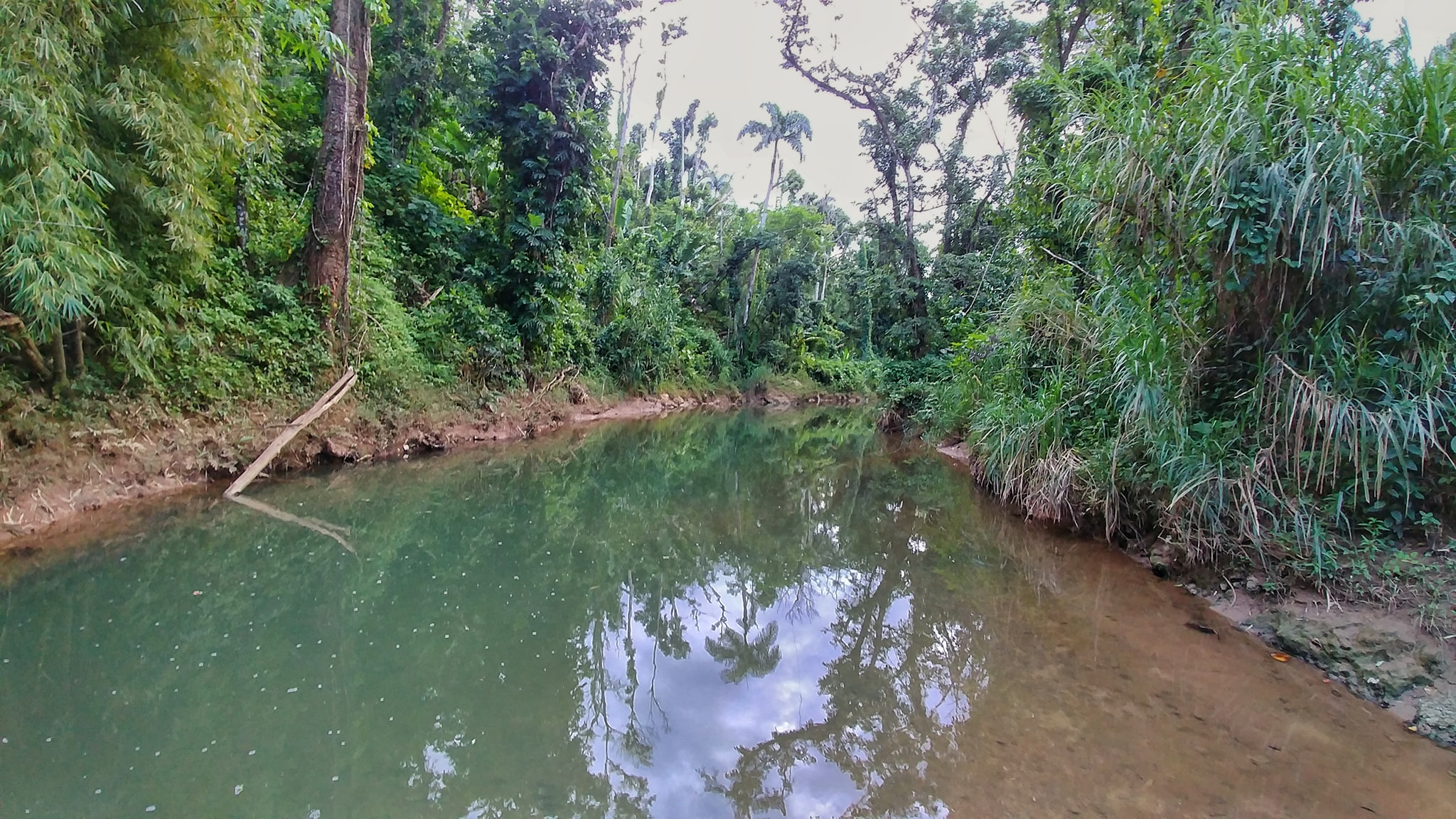
- Guajataca River between Guajataca and Cibao

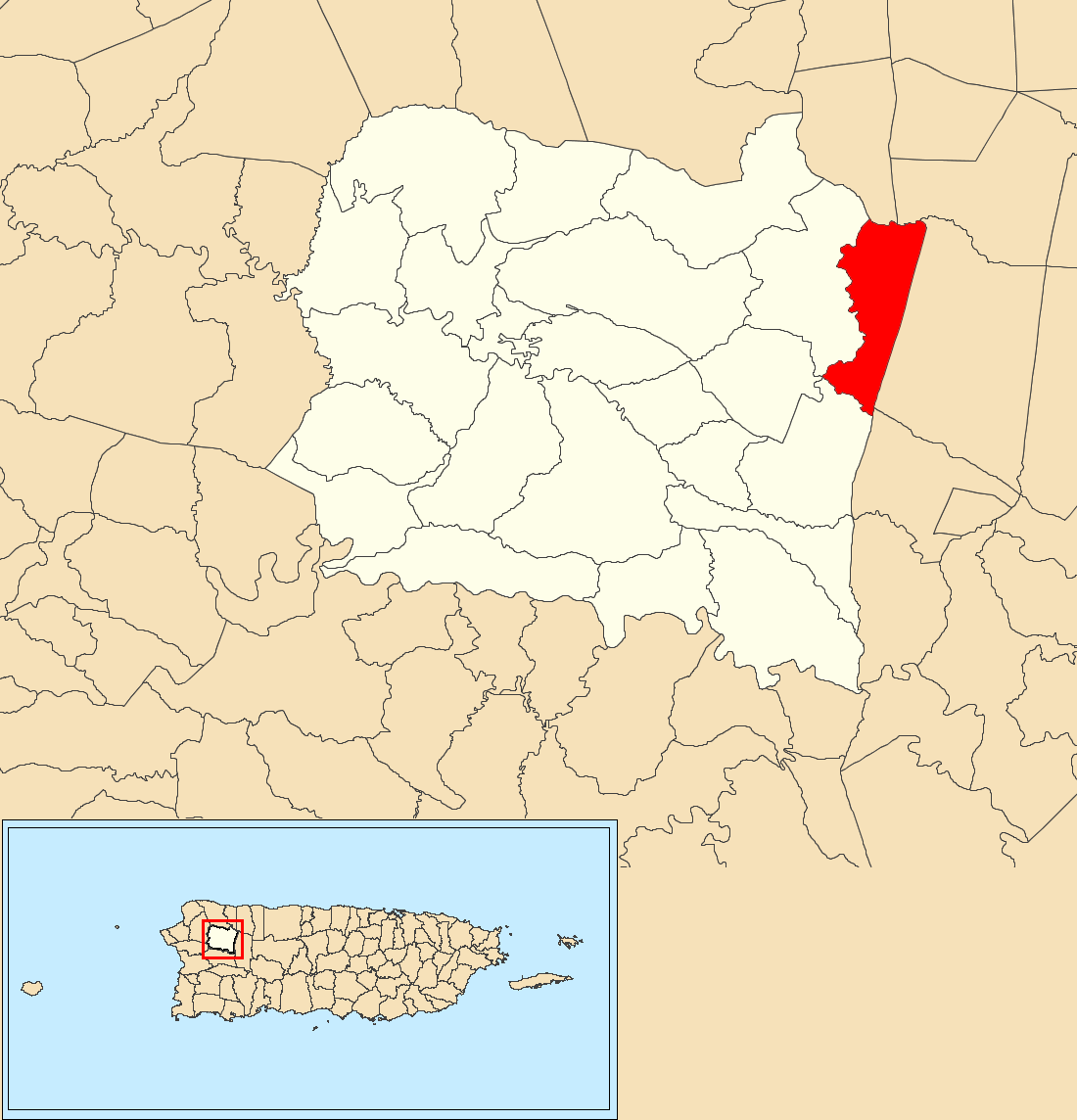
- Location of Cibao within the municipality of San Sebastián shown in red

- Location of Puerto Rico
- Coordinates: 18°20′36″N 66°54′13″W
- Commonwealth: Puerto Rico
- Municipality: San Sebastián

Area
  - Total: 2.57 sq mi (6.7 km^{2})
  - Land: 2.52 sq mi (6.5 km^{2})
  - Water: 0.05 sq mi (0.13 km^{2})
- Elevation: 899 ft (274 m)

Population (2010)
  - Total: 1,224
  - Density: 485.7/sq mi (187.5/km^{2})
- Source: 2010 Census
- Time zone: UTC−4 (AST)

Cibao is a barrio in the municipality of San Sebastián, Puerto Rico. Its population in 2010 was 1,224.

== History ==
Cibao was in Spain's gazetteers until Puerto Rico was ceded by Spain in the aftermath of the Spanish–American War under the terms of the Treaty of Paris of 1898 and became an unincorporated territory of the United States. In 1899, the United States Department of War conducted a census of Puerto Rico finding that the combined population of Cibao and Guajataca barrios was 1,169.

Historical population
Census	Pop.	Note	%±
1910	601		—
1920	658		9.5%
1930	772		17.3%
1940	1,062		37.6%
1950	1,078		1.5%
1960	965		−10.5%
1970	893		−7.5%
1980	1,125		26.0%
1990	1,061		−5.7%
2000	1,218		14.8%
2010	1,224		0.5%
U.S. Decennial Census; 1900 (N/A) 1910-1930; 1930-1950 1980-2000 2010

== Sectors ==
Barrios (which are, in contemporary times, roughly comparable to minor civil divisions) in turn are further subdivided into smaller local populated place areas/units called sectores (sectors in English). The types of sectores may vary, from normally sector to urbanización to reparto to barriada to residencial, among others.

The following sectors are in Cibao barrio:

Avenida Emérito Estrada Rivera, Carretera 451, Carretera 455, Cibao Abrahonda, Comunidad González, Parcelas Montaña de Piedra, Residencial Andrés Méndez Liciaga, Residencial San Andrés, Sector Ango Román, Sector Finca Los Robles, Sector La Gallera, Sector Ortíz, Sector Pablo Rivera, Sector Pueblito, Sector Pueblo Nuevo, Sector Quiles, Urbanización Colinas Verdes, Urbanización La Estancia, Urbanización Montaña de Piedra, and Urbanización Pepino.

== See also ==
- List of communities in Puerto Rico
- List of barrios and sectors of San Sebastián, Puerto Rico
