= Guajataka Scout Reservation =

Scout reservation of the Puerto Rico Council of Scouting America

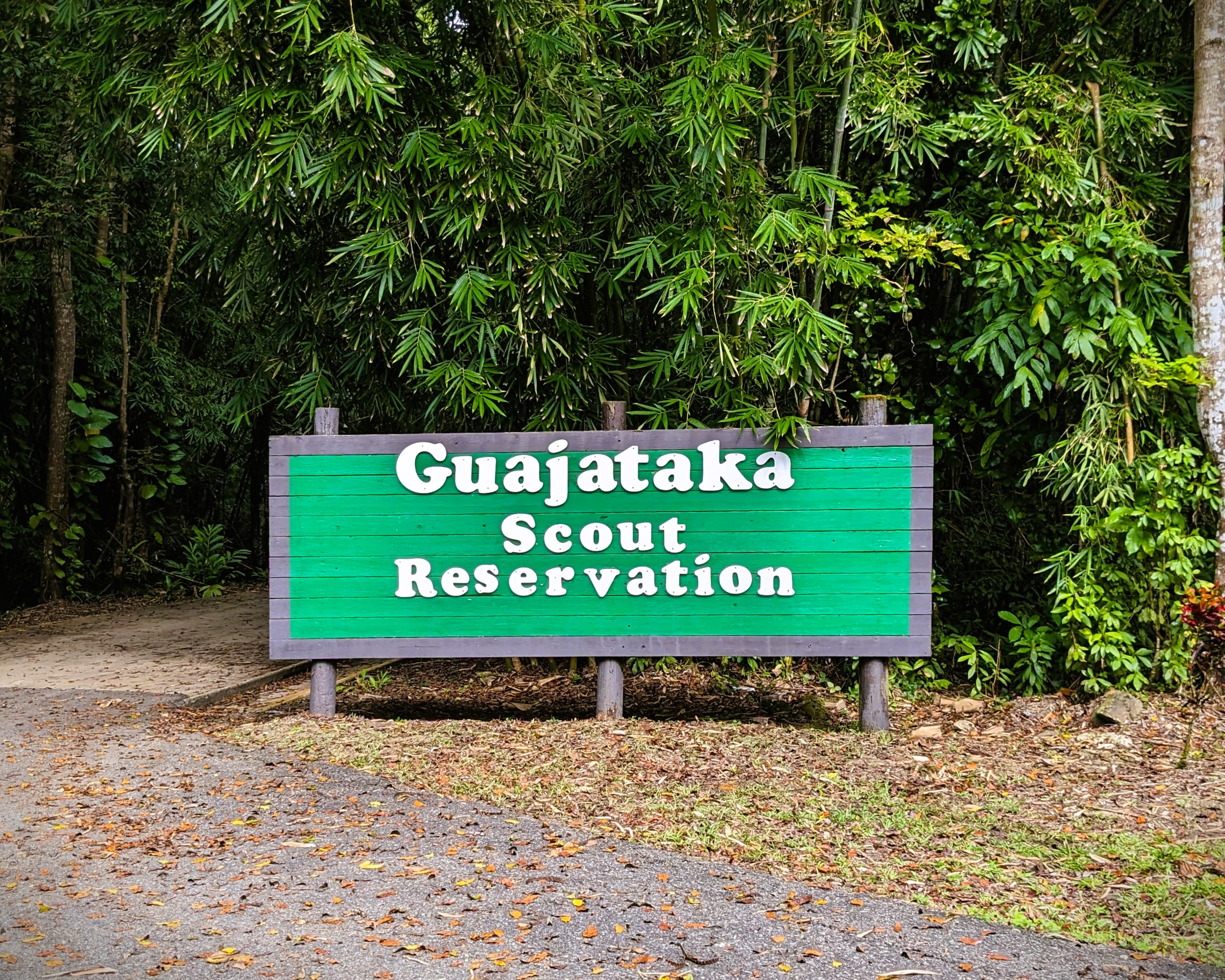
- Entrance to Guajataka Scout Reservation

- Nickname: Sanctuary of Friendship
- Other names: Campamento Guajataka; Camp Guajataka
- Owner: Puerto Rico Council
- Location: PR-119 Km 23.9; Barrio Guajataca; San Sebastián, Puerto Rico
- Coordinates: 18.36814°N 66.92056°W
- Founded: 1938
- Camp Director: Antonio "Tony" Laboy
- Program Director: Andrés "Vader" Sepúlveda
- Camp Ranger: Antonio Anglada
- Website https://scoutingpr.org/guajataka

Guajataka Scout Reservation Map
1 Dining Hall
2 Ángel Ramos Building
3 Interfaith Chapel
4 Campsite A
5 Campsite B
6 Campsite C
7 Campsite D
8 Campsite M
9 Campsite SP
10 Paquito Joglar
11 Cóbana Negra
12 Manolín
13 Swimming pools
14 Campfire
15 Shooting Range
16 Canoe Base
17 COPE Tower
18 Nature Lodge
19 Basketball Court
20 El Zorzal building (First Aid, cantina, administration offices, storage and meeting room)
21 Robert Baden-Powell statue
22 Frank H. Wadsworth memorial

Guajataka Scout Reservation or Camp Guajataka (Campamento Guajataka in Spanish), often simply referred to as Guajataka and nicknamed Santuario de Amistad (English: Sanctuary of Friendship), is a Scout reservation of the Puerto Rico Council of the Scouting America (Note: Formerly Boy Scouts of America, as of February 8, 2025.) organization, and the council's only camping grounds. The camp is located in San Sebastián, Puerto Rico, in the northwest, and partially borders the southern portion of Guajataca Lake, from which the camp takes part of its name. The camp was founded in 1938 with the transfer of land from the Government of Puerto Rico to the Puerto Rico Council. The facility has a participant capacity of little more than 500 individuals with amenities such as a dining hall, lodging cabins, a nondenominational chapel, swimming pools, and a First Aid lodge. The location and climate allows for year-round recreational activities such as camping, seminars, leadership trainings and other Scouting-related activities.

== Natural features and wildlife ==
The scout reservation is located 200 meters above sea level with a topology which includes level land and low hills. The camp is situated a short distance from a scenic, two-mile canyon of the tributary Guajataca River between steep cliffs which is accessible by canoe. Natural limestone caverns are a short drive away. The camp's tropical forest is home to more than 50 species of trees, such as Stahlia monosperma which are rare and endangered species. More than 60 species of birds which include hummingbirds, quail-doves, peregrine falcons, ospreys, owls, pelicans and grebes. Numerous reptiles and amphibians such as tree frogs and coquís are also found in the forest. Various species of fish such peacock bass, largemouth bass, sunfish, perch, catfish, tilapia and threadfin shad can be found in Guajataca Lake.

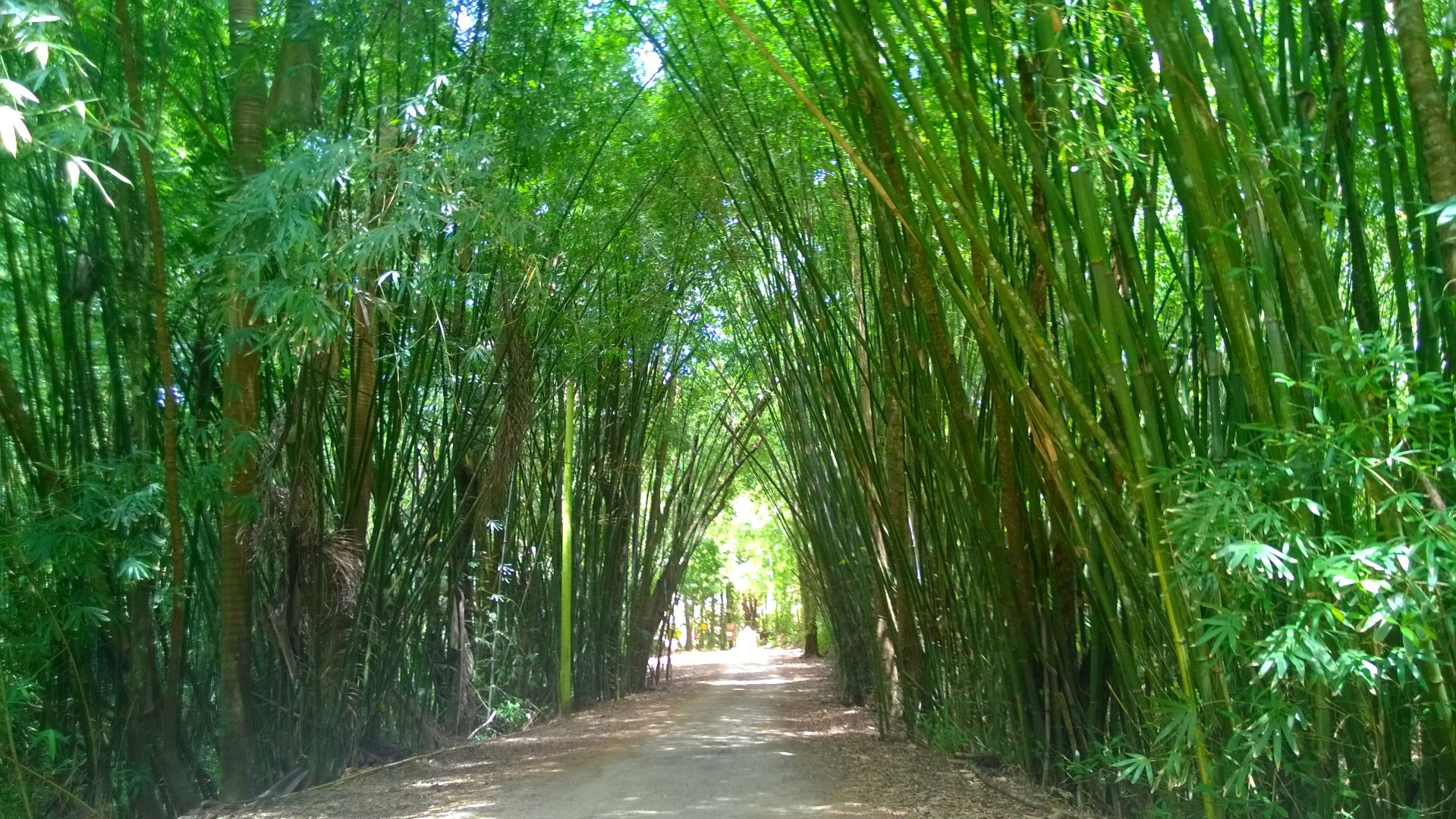
Entryway to Guajataka Scout Reservation among the bamboo forest

== Lodging facilities ==
Scouts and leaders who visit are lodged in one of the ten campsites, in-campsite cabins or stand-alone cabin-campsites of the reservation. The campsites feature a series of concrete-and-wood cabins which house the visiting campers. Some of the campsite areas are identified by letters (Campsites A, B, C, D, M, SP) while the Paquito Joglar, El Palomar, Casa Manolín and Cóbana Negra campsites are stand-alone cabin-campsites that are located inside the camp's vast tropical mameyuelo woods. Cóbana Negra is designed to better accommodate persons with disabilities. The Paquito Joglar and Manolín cabins are named in honor of distinguished Scouting figures of Puerto Rico, Francisco "Paquito" Joglar Herrero and Manuel González Jones ("Don Mano"), respectively. The SP or Swimming Pool Campsite, Palomar and Cóbana Negra cabins are named based on their location, flora or physical characteristics.

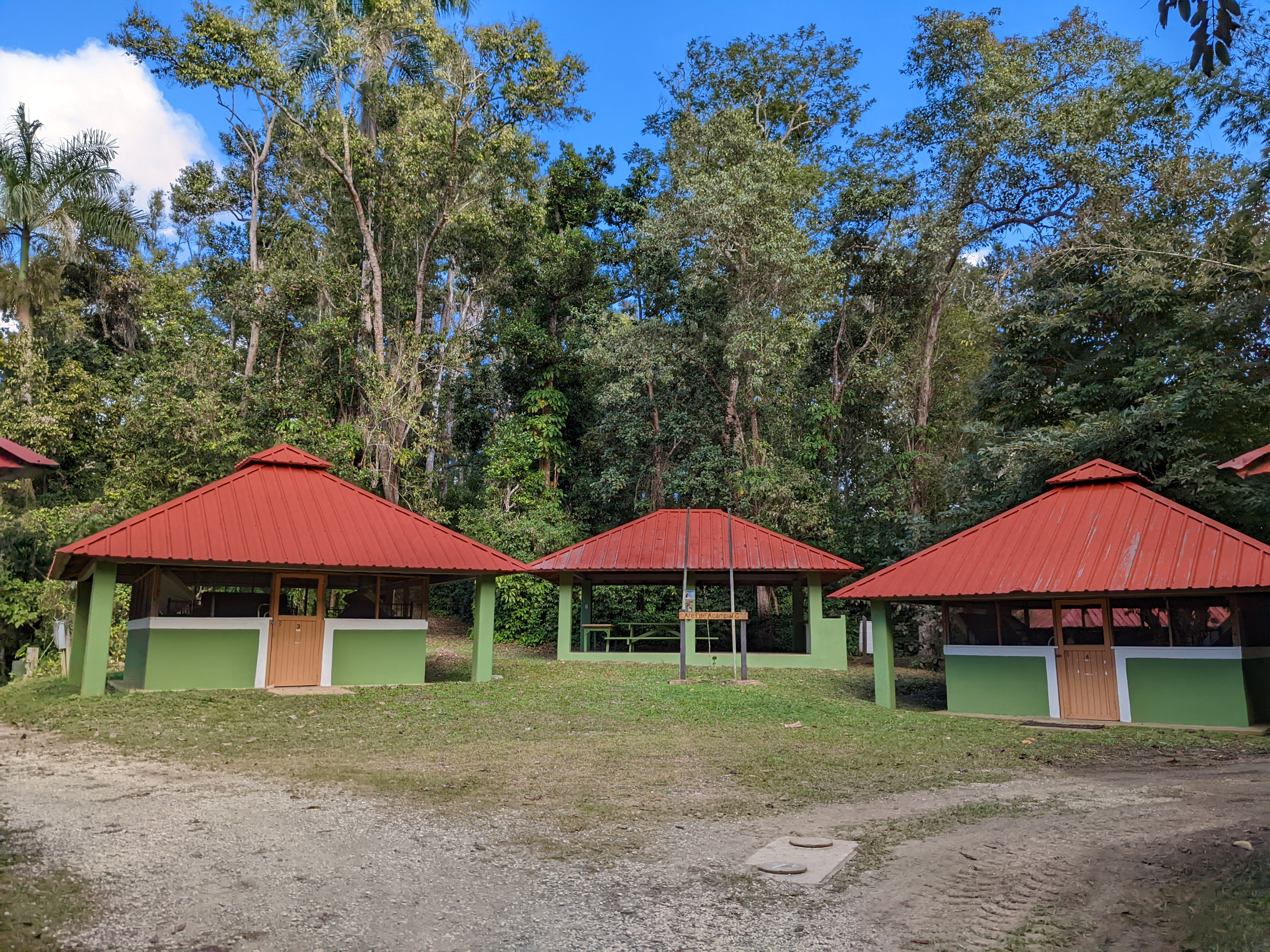
Campsite C cabins

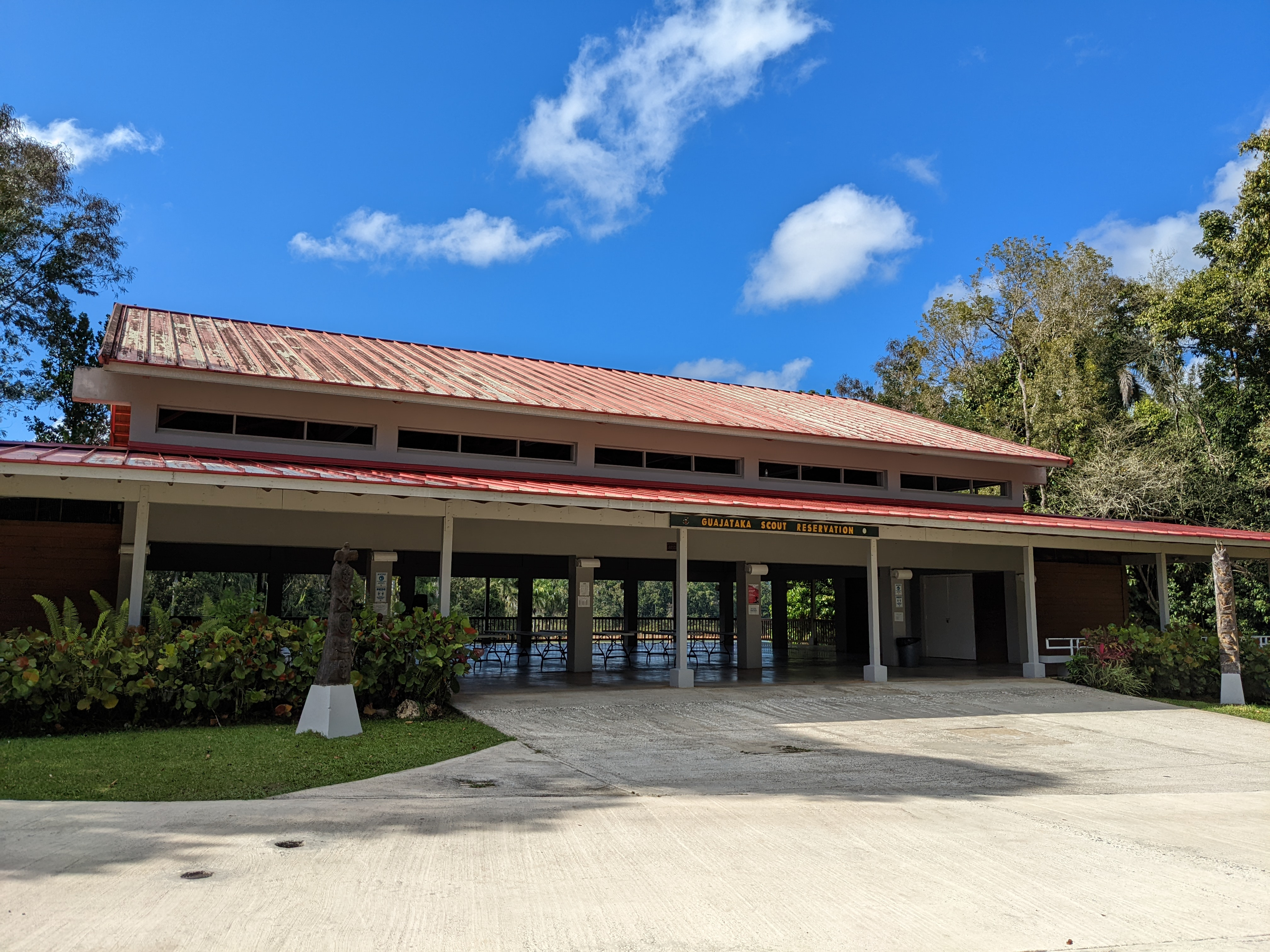
Ángel Ramos Building located in Camp Guajataka

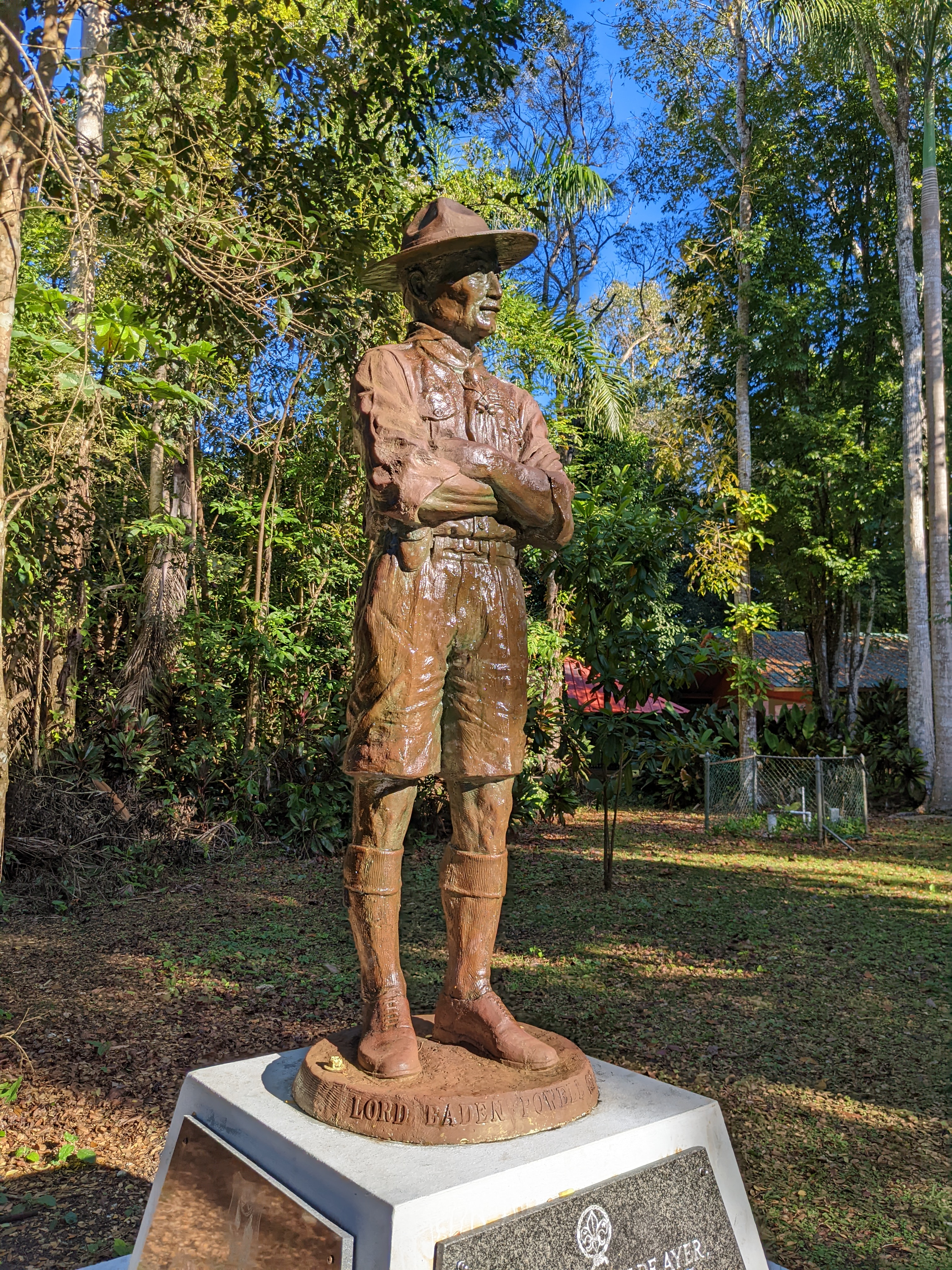
Robert Baden-Powell statue

== Programs and activities ==
The camp runs year-round with the most popular seasons being Holy Week, Summer and Christmas. The main program runs during the summer, in which ten weeks are divided for Cub Scouts, Scouts BSA, and Venturing. The Christmas season runs for a single week and summarizes the summer's offerings open for both Cub Scouts and Scouts BSA. A short three-to-four-day camp has also been offered during spring break with a similar program to the one offered during the Christmas camp. The camp also operates off-season for special troop activities or external groups that wish to experience the outdoor spirit of the reservation as well as activities such as canoeing, archery and BB rifle shooting. COPE program activities, which include rappelling and climbing, as well as Wood Badge courses are offered at Camp Guajataka.

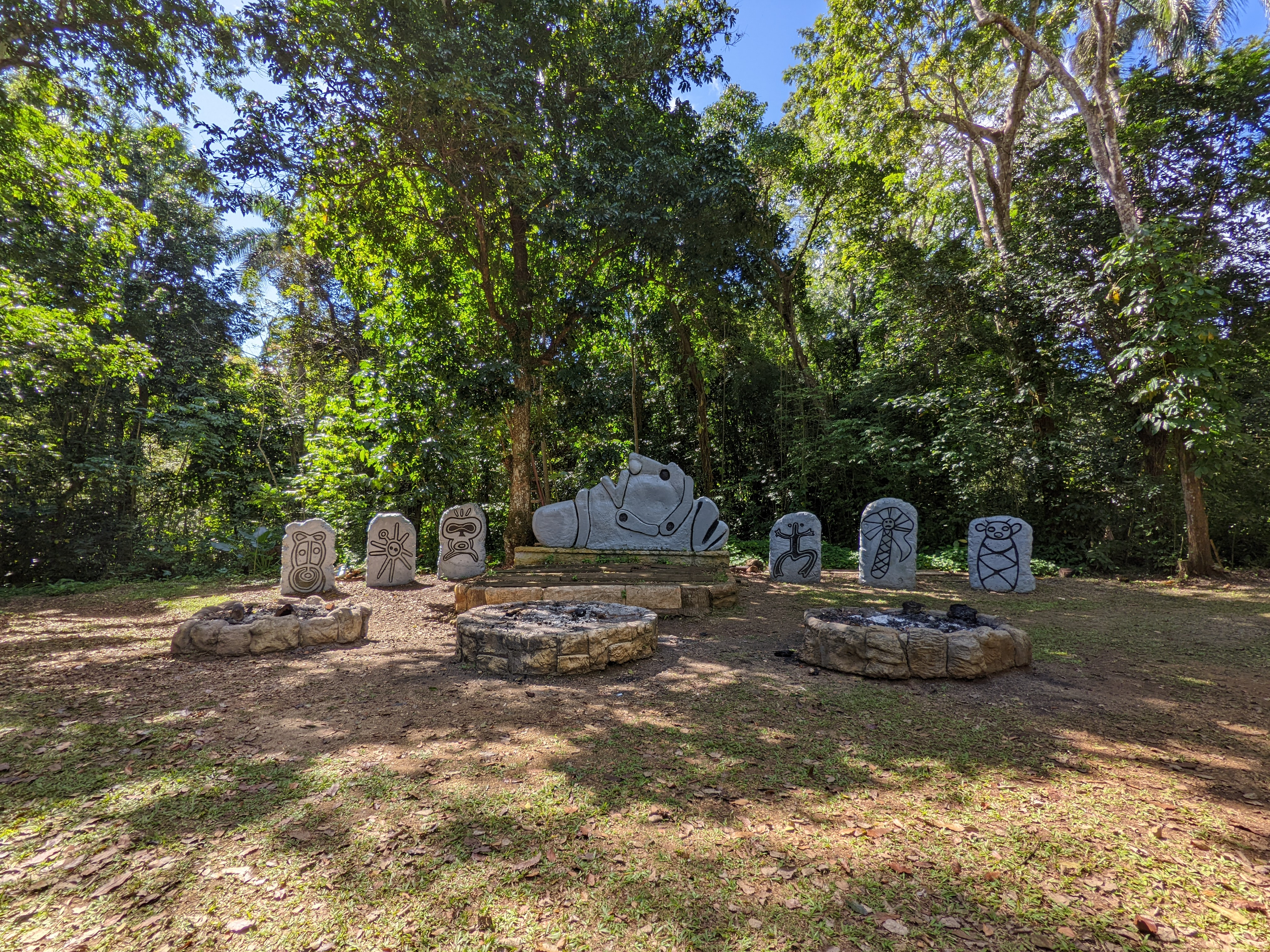
Guajataka Scout Reservation campfire area

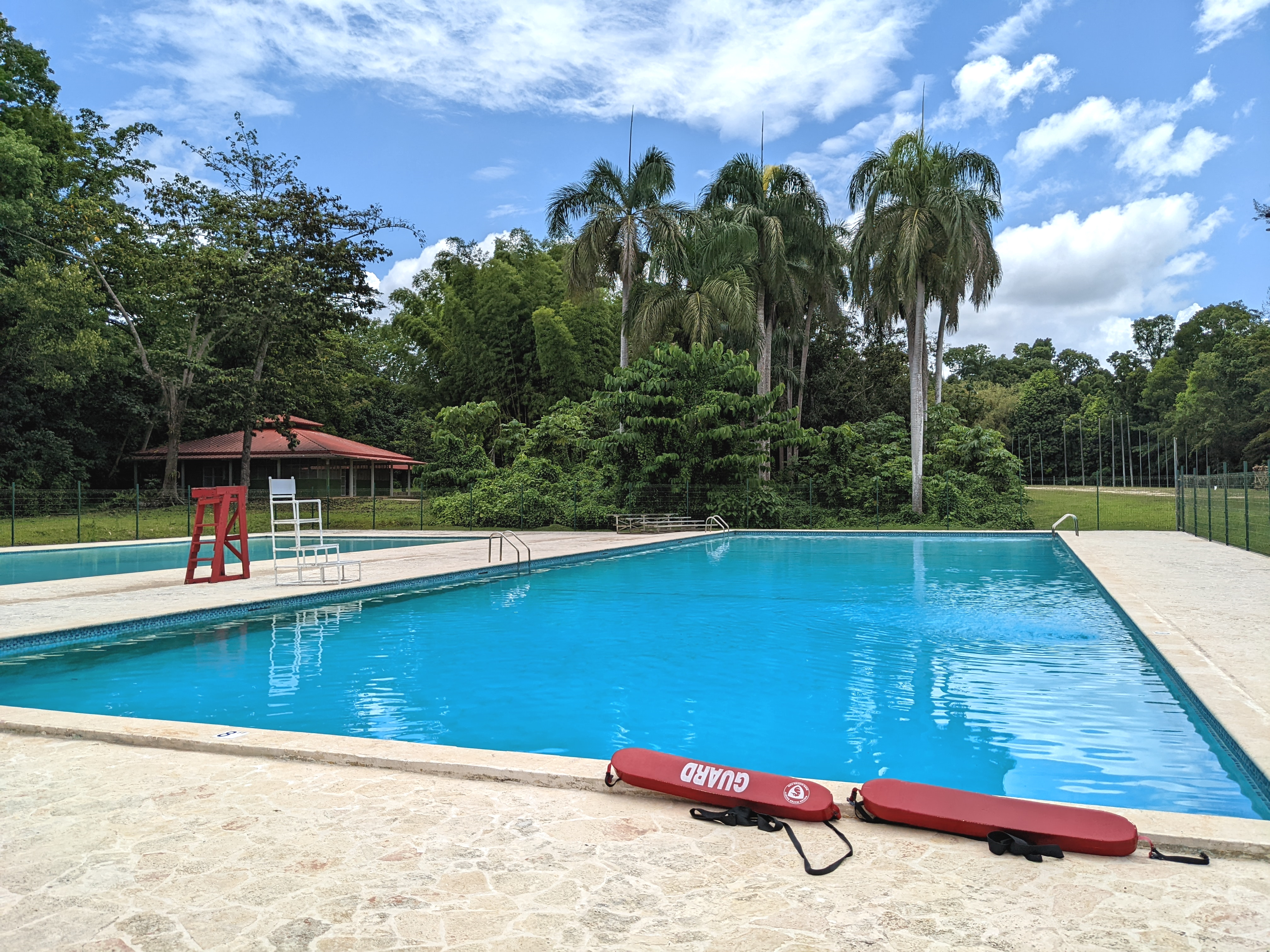
Pools

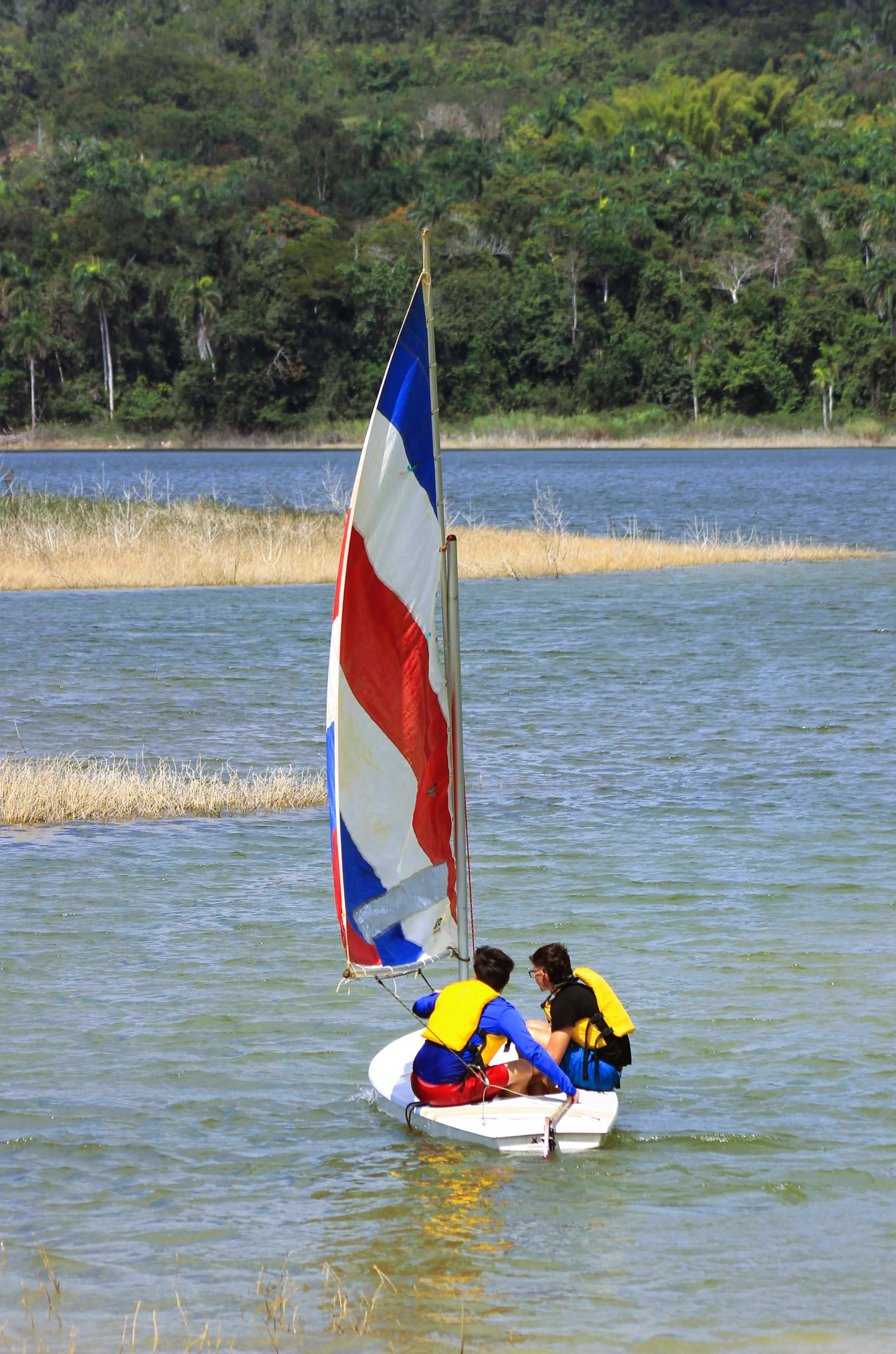
Sailing on Lake Guajataca

=== Yokahu Lodge ===
Guajataka is the official home of Yokahu Lodge, the council's Order of the Arrow Lodge. Most of Yokahu Lodge's activities are celebrated in the camp and for years the Order has given service to the facilities. The OA has its own campsite, called "The Cabin", which occupancy has been discontinued due to structural damages, but remains standing. In the past, the Paquito Joglar campsite area was considered the official gathering place for the Lodge, later becoming a campers area due to the need of space for the many Scouts that attended camp in summer.

=== Camp staff ===
The staff of the camp are structured based on Scouting's patrol system. These patrols are based on different specialization areas in the camp's program. The current patrols are:

- Program Aide - Established in 1938, specializing in Scoutcraft.
- Nature Team - Established in 1952 by renowned forester Dr. Frank H. Wadsworth, specializing in ecology and conservation.
- Aquatic Team - Specializes in pool and lake activities.
- Sport Team - Specializes in sports and recreation.
- Administrative Staff - Specializing in camp administration as well as cantina and Trading Post management.
- Expedition Voyagers - Specializing in high adventure activities, such as treks and Project C.O.P.E.

Each patrol is led by a director, an adult leader who serves as the patrol's administrative official, and a Patrol Leader, a youth in charge of the patrol's specific program. Historically, each patrol had its own campsite nearby or next to their base of operations in the wooded areas of the camp, where they pitched their own tents and worked on pioneering gates that awed campers and visitors alike. All staff members were located in a single house cabin called Casa Staff (Staff House) from 2006 until 2018. Patrols campsites were later reinstated in 2019 in the wooded areas of Guaraguao (Nature Team), Bosquesito (Administrative Staff), Caja de Muerto (Sport Team), Pailas (Aquatic Team) and Tinieblas (Program Aide).

Due to its long history, the patrol system has served to develop a series of traditions inside each patrol. A tradition shared by all patrols is a simple recognition, symbolized by a neckerchief, presented to a staff member who has truly served the patrol and the camp by demonstrating and sharing their knowledge, having been a member of the patrol for at least years. Another shared camp staff tradition is the matching-color shoelaces that members of each patrol wear to identify themselves: red (Program Aide), forest green (Nature Team), light blue (Aquatic Team), purple (Sport Team), yellow (Administrative Staff) and navy blue (Expedition Voyagers).

== Hurricane Maria ==
In 2017 Guajataka Scout Reservation suffered major damage during Hurricane Maria. In the aftermath of the storm, the Guajataca Dam, which holds back the water in Guajataca Lake, came close to failure. In the months which followed the storm, Scouts from around the world aided in rebuilding efforts through donations and volunteer activities.

== See also ==
- Scouting in Puerto Rico
- Yokahu Lodge
- List of council camps (Boy Scouts of America)
- Frank H. Wadsworth
- Guajataka Scout Reservation on Facebook
