= Elisa Colberg =

Teacher, founder of Girl Scouting in Puerto Rico

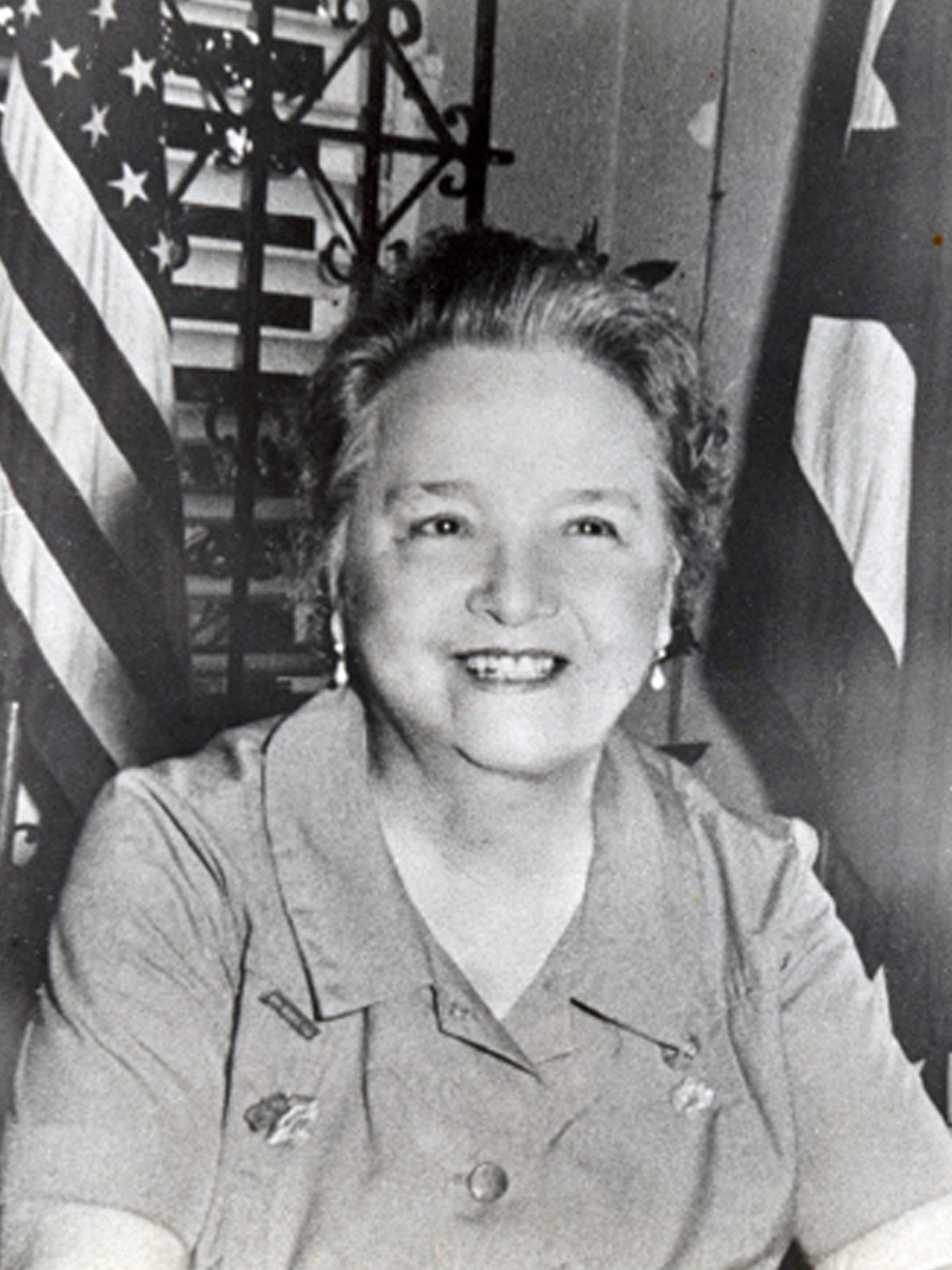
- Born: April 26, 1903; Cabo Rojo, Puerto Rico
- Died: February 14, 1976 (aged 72); San Juan, Puerto Rico
- Occupation(s): Teaching, Scouting

Elisa Colberg (March 13, 1905 – 1986) was the founder of the Puerto Rican Girl Scouts, the first troop of which formed in 1926 in Cabo Rojo, aptly named Hijas de Betances. She continued as head of the Girl Scout organisation in Puerto Rico for 27 years. Camp Elisa Colberg, near El Yunque National Forest, is named in her memory.

Baptised as Elisa Esther Colberg Ramirez, Colberg was the fifth child of Rodolfo Colberg Pabón and Castora Ramirez Colberg, born in Cabo Rojo, Puerto Rico. She attended a series of schools, including Carbonell, Curry and Salvador Brau, graduated from the University of Puerto Rico in 1925. A year later, after founded a leadership course with twenty enrollees which went on to become the Girl Scout organisation of Puerto Rico. Becoming a qualified teacher in 1928, Colberg retired in 1971, at which time the Scouting organisation had grown to 14,000 children in 654 troops.

== Honors ==
- A street in the San Juan, Puerto Rico neighborhood of Miramar where the Caribe Girl Scouts Council is located is named after Elisa Colberg.

== See also ==
- Juliette Gordon Low
