= Guajataca, San Sebastián, Puerto Rico =

Barrio of Puerto Rico

Guajataca
- Barrio
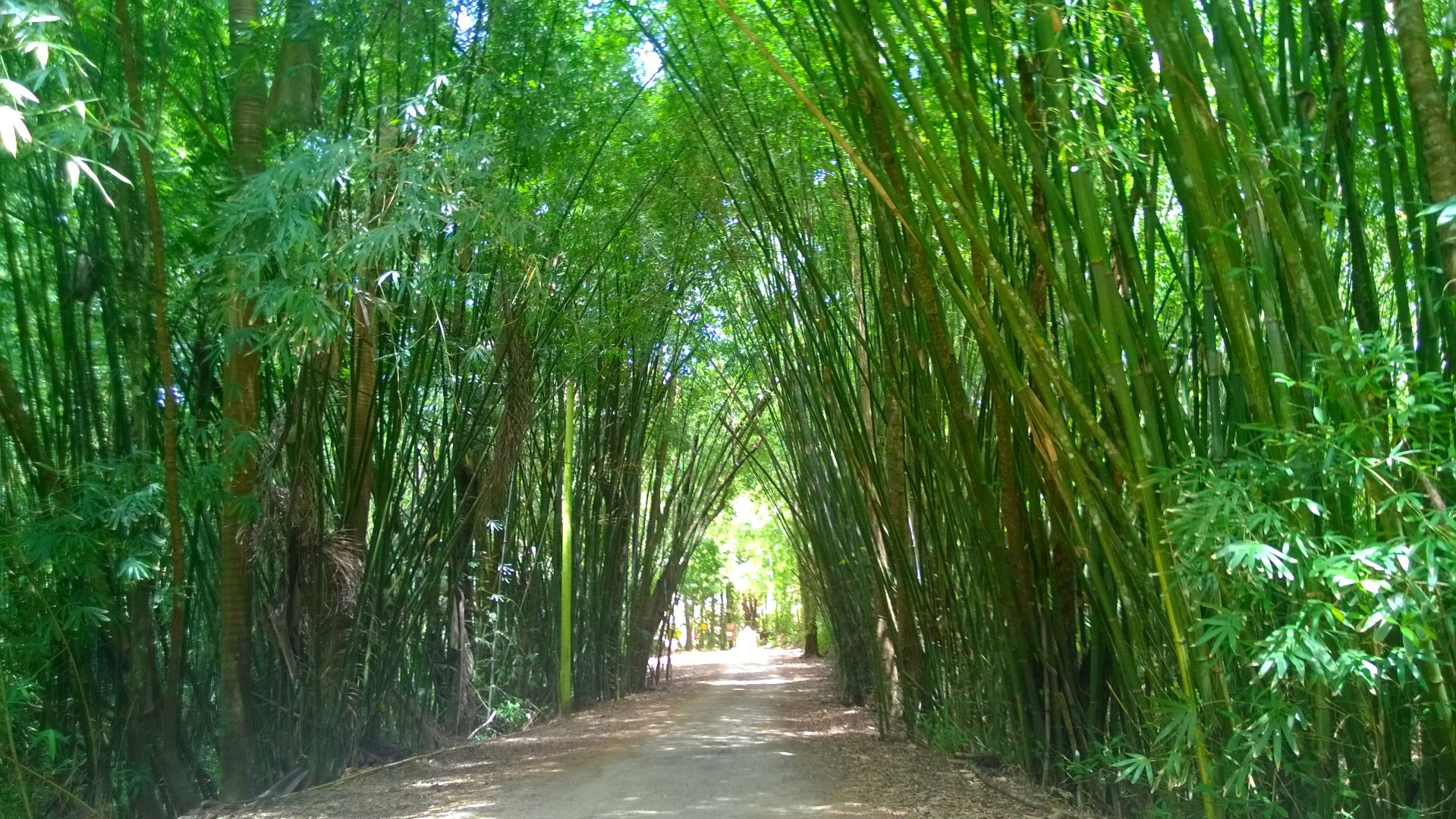
- Entrance to Guajataka Scout Reservation in Guajataca

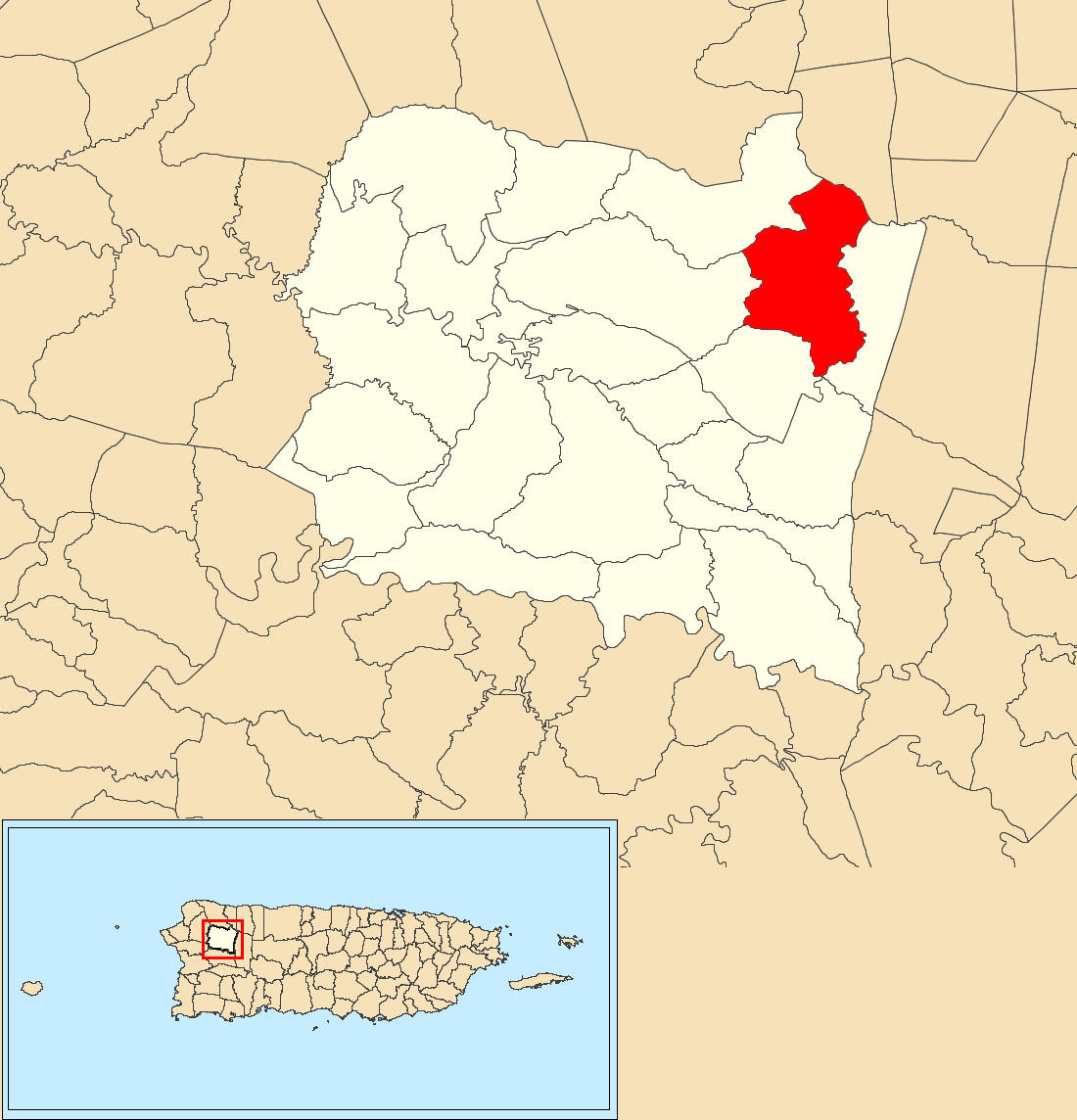
- Location of Guajataca within the municipality of San Sebastián shown in red

- Location of Puerto Rico
- Coordinates: 18°21′19″N 66°55′25″W
- Commonwealth: Puerto Rico
- Municipality: San Sebastián

Area
  - Total: 3.91 sq mi (10.1 km^{2})
  - Land: 3.63 sq mi (9.4 km^{2})
  - Water: 0.28 sq mi (0.73 km^{2})
- Elevation: 860 ft (260 m)

Population (2010)
  - Total: 603
  - Density: 166.1/sq mi (64.1/km^{2})
- Source: 2010 Census
- Time zone: UTC−4 (AST)

Guajataca is a barrio in the municipality of San Sebastián, Puerto Rico. Its population in 2010 was 603. The Guajataka Scout Reservation is located within Barrio Guajataka.

== History ==
Guajataca was in Spain's gazetteers until Puerto Rico was ceded by Spain in the aftermath of the Spanish–American War under the terms of the Treaty of Paris of 1898 and became an unincorporated territory of the United States. In 1899, the United States Department of War conducted a census of Puerto Rico finding that the combined population of Cibao and Guajataca barrios was 1,169.

Historical population
Census	Pop.	Note	%±
1910	811		—
1920	811		0.0%
1930	891		9.9%
1940	838		−5.9%
1950	784		−6.4%
1960	661		−15.7%
1970	454		−31.3%
1980	600		32.2%
1990	576		−4.0%
2000	700		21.5%
2010	603		−13.9%
U.S. Decennial Census; 1900 (N/A) 1910-1930; 1930-1950 1980-2000 2010

== Sectors ==
Barrios (which are, in contemporary times, roughly comparable to minor civil divisions) in turn are further subdivided into smaller local populated place areas/units called sectores (sectors in English). The types of sectores may vary, from normally sector to urbanización to reparto to barriada to residencial, among others.

The following sectors are in Guajataca barrio:

Carretera 455, Sector Colo Medina, Sector Confesor Soto, Sector Empalme, Sector Fondo del Saco, Sector Lebrón, Sector Los Vázquez, Sector Millo Matos, Sector Roberto Jiménez, Sector Román, Sector Salto Collazo, Sector Sico Aponte, Sector Toño Fuentes, Sector Varela, and Sector Yeyo González.

== See also ==
- List of communities in Puerto Rico
- List of barrios and sectors of San Sebastián, Puerto Rico
