= Guajataca River =

River of Puerto Rico

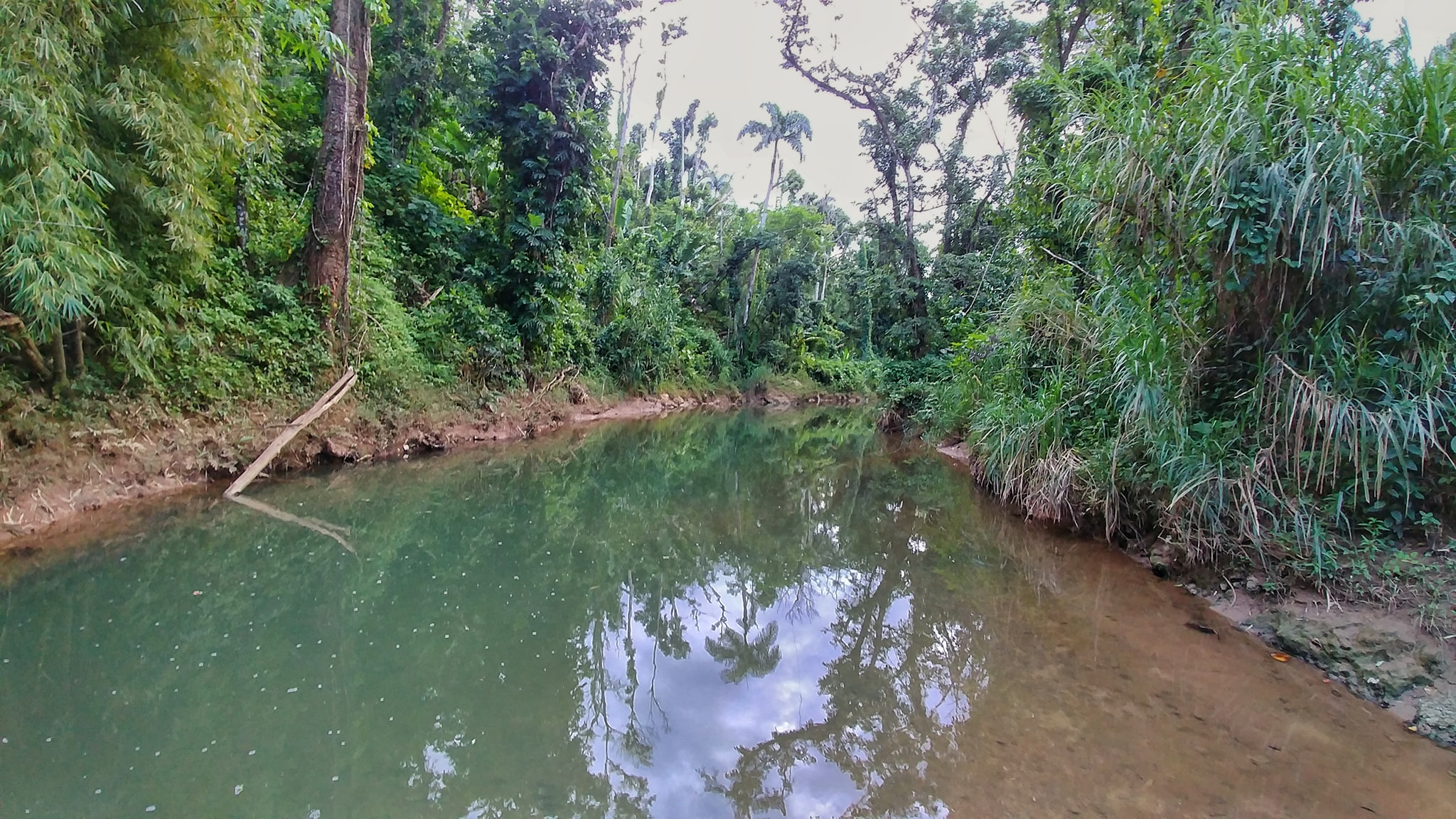
- Guajataca River in San Sebastián

- Native name: Río Guajataca (Spanish)

Location
- Commonwealth: Puerto Rico
- Municipality: Lares, San Sebastián, Quebradillas, Isabela

Physical characteristics
- Source
  - location: Buenos Aires in Lares, Puerto Rico
  - coordinates: 18°22′42.9″N 66°55′04.5″W
- Mouth
  - location: Atlantic Ocean in the border between the municipalities of Isabela and Quebradillas
- Length: 25.5 miles (41.0 km)

Guajataca River (Spanish: Río Guajataca) is a river in Lares, Puerto Rico. It is located on the northwest coast of the island. It flows from the south and drains into the Atlantic Ocean. The name was given by the original Taino inhabitants prior to the arrival of Christopher Columbus.

Guajataca River has a length of approximately 25.5 miles (41.0 kilometers) with its origin in the Buenos Aires barrio of the municipality of Lares, Puerto Rico at an altitude of approximately 1,600 feet (490 meters) above sea level. It crosses the municipalities of Lares, San Sebastián, Quebradillas, and Isabela forming Guajataca Lake on its path.

The river also gives name to one of the principal lodgings in the area, Parador Guajataca. Guajataca, sometimes spelled Guajataka, is also the name of an area in the municipality of San Sebastián.

The river also carries the name and the subsequent reservoir, Lago Guajataca, built by the United States Army Corps of Engineers with a dam owned by the Puerto Rico Electrical Authority.

Many schools, businesses, and organizations, including a parador, Guajataka Scout Reservation, and kayak excursion company are named for the area as well.

== Gallery ==
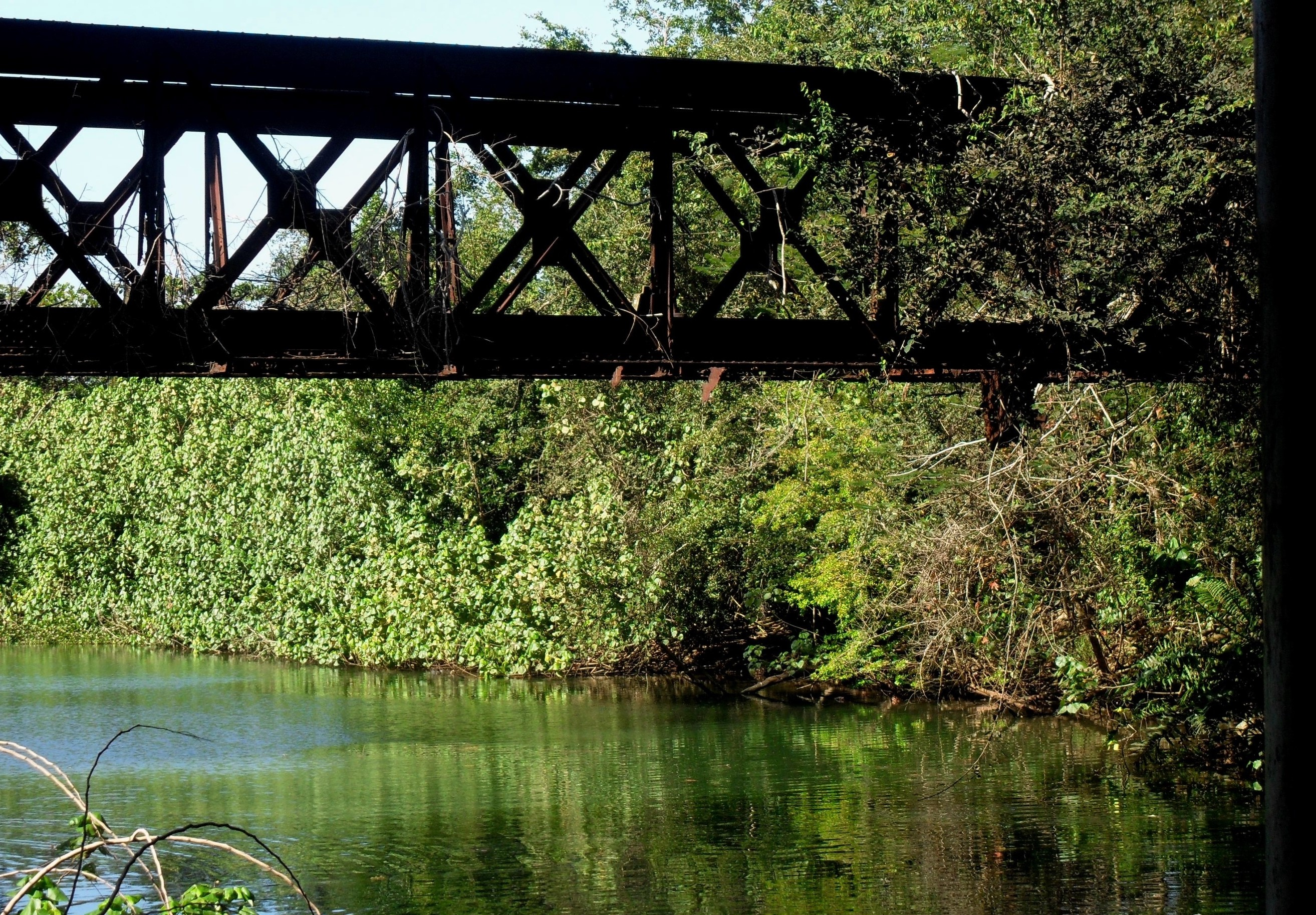
Ruins of an old bridge over Guajataca River

== See also ==
- List of rivers of Puerto Rico
