= Scouting in Puerto Rico =

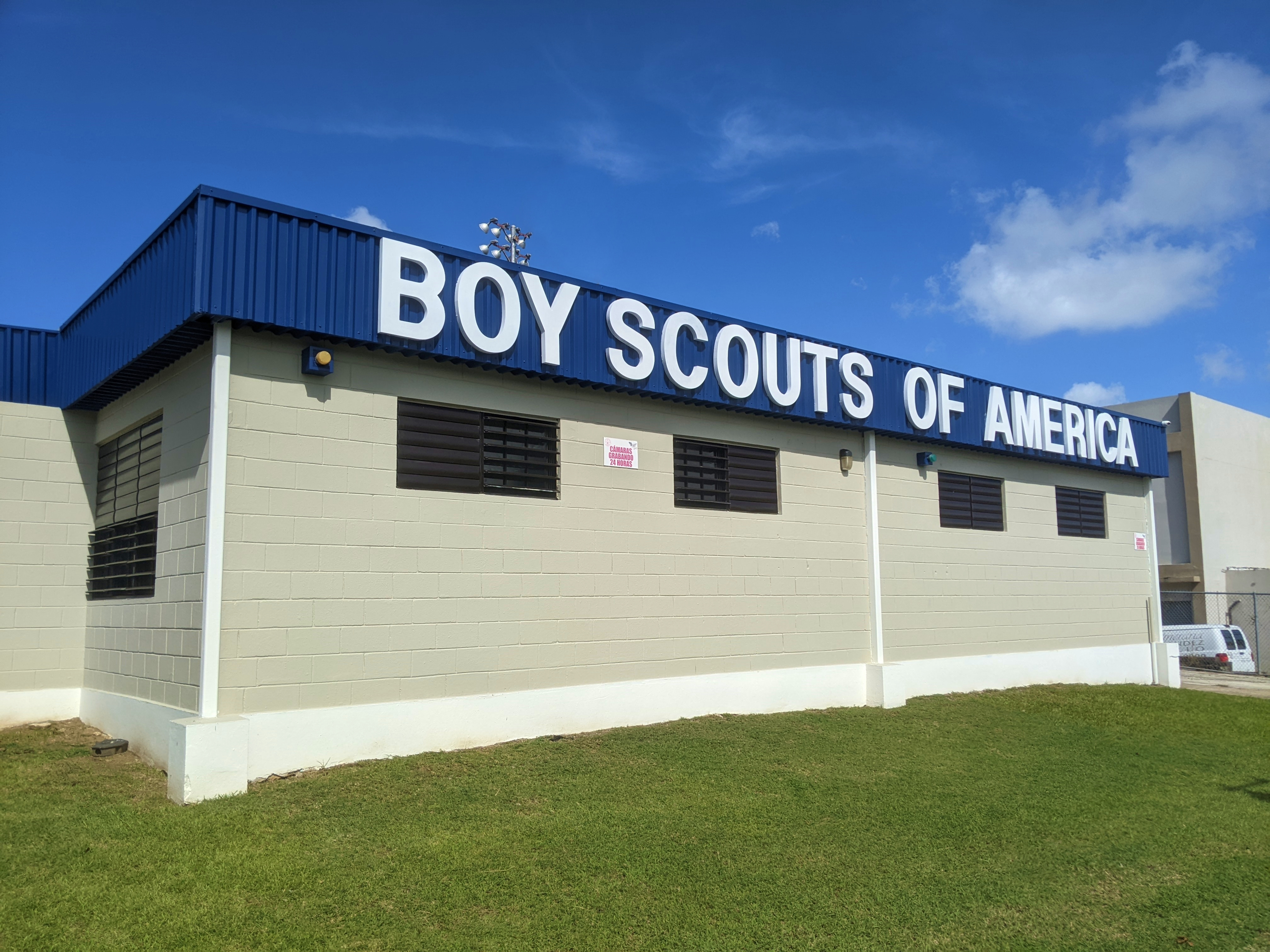
- Puerto Rico Council of Scouting America (Note: Formerly Boy Scouts of America, as of February 8, 2025.)

Scouting in Puerto Rico was introduced in the 1920s, and has been serving both boys and girls in the island since then. Scouting America serves both boys and girls in different programs, while the Girl Scouts of the USA serves only girls in various levels.

== Scouting America Puerto Rico Council ==
Puerto Rico Council (661)
- Puerto Rico Council shoulder patch
- Concilio de Puerto Rico
- Owner: Scouting America
- Age range: Cub Scouts: 5–11 (co-ed youth; single-gender dens); Scouts BSA: 11–17 (co-ed youth; single-gender troops); Venturing and Sea Scouts: 13–21 (co-ed youth); Cub Scout Packs and Scout Troops: 18+ (co-ed adults); Venturing Units and Sea Scouting Ships: 22+ (co-ed adults)
- Headquarters: Guaynabo, Puerto Rico
- Location: Puerto Rico
- Coordinates: 18.37338°N 66.11088°W
- Founded: November 15, 1927
- Membership: 9,700+
- President: Rafael Arthur Torres
- Scout Executive: Clint Scharff
- Council Commissioner: Jeremy Ortiz
- Website scoutingpr.org

=== Puerto Rico Council ===
The Puerto Rico Council (Spanish: Concilio de Puerto Rico) was founded in 1927 as the Puerto Rico and Virgin Islands Council, part of the Northeast Region of Scouting America. The Virgin Islands District was separated into the Virgin Islands Council in 1965. But it was absolved by the National Capital Area Council in 2013, restoring the Virgin Islands District again. Thousands of youth and volunteers participate in its four main programs; Cub Scouts, Scouts BSA, Venturing and Sea Scouts. Their mission is to prepare the youth in making correct choices ethically and morally for their future by learning the Scout Law and Scout Promise. According to a statistics report by Scouting Magazine, Puerto Rico had 189 Scouts to reach Eagle Scouts in 2016 and 128 in 2017.

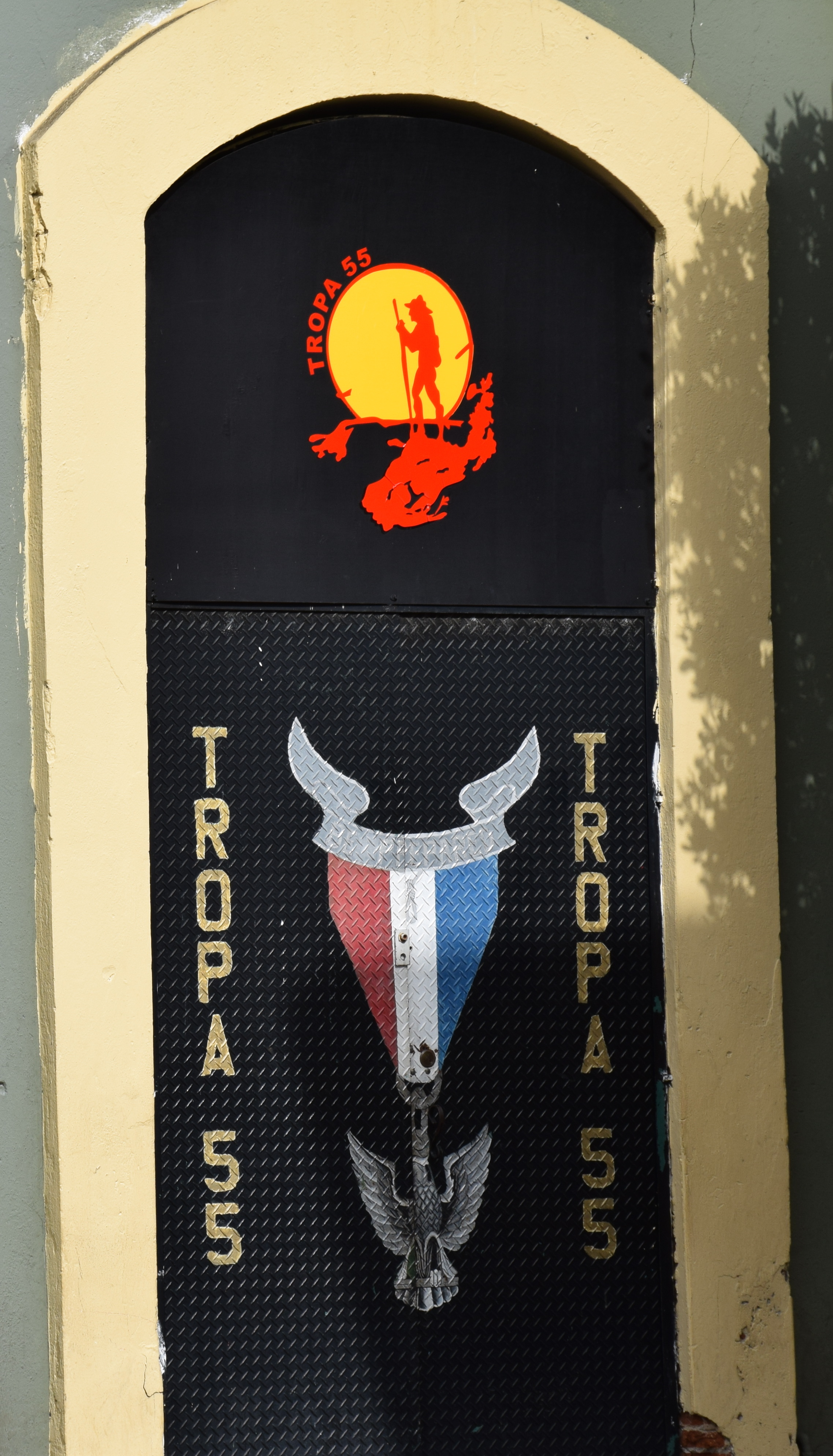
Troop 55 from Mayagüez, Puerto Rico

=== Organization ===
The Puerto Rico Council is divided into six districts, all named based on the Taíno name of each of the districts' base area:

- Arasibo District, based in Arecibo, covers the northern and central area of Puerto Rico, from Quebradillas to Vega Baja.
- Borinquén District, based in Caguas, covers the eastern area of Puerto Rico, from Aibonito to Ceiba.
- Caribe District, based in Ponce, covers the southern area of Puerto Rico from Yauco to Patillas.
- Guaitiao District, based in San Juan, covers the northeastern area of Puerto Rico, from Guaynabo to Luquillo.
- Majagua District, based in Bayamón covers the north-northeastern area of Puerto Rico from Vega Alta to Bayamón.
- Yagüeka District, based in Mayagüez, covers the western area of Puerto Rico, from Isabela to Sabana Grande.

=== Ideals ===
Puerto Rico is one of the few councils of the Scouting America organization that uses Spanish as its main language for all programs, including the Scout Promise and Law.

==== Scout Promise ====
English: On my honor, I will do my best, to do my duty, to God and my country, and to obey the Scout Law, to help other people at all times, to keep myself physically strong, mentally awake, and morally straight.

Spanish: Por mi honor, prometo hacer todo lo posible, para cumplir con mis deberes para con Dios y mi patria, obedecer la Ley del escucha, ayudar a mis semejantes en toda ocasión, mantenerme físicamente fuerte, mentalmente alerta y moralmente recto.

==== Scout Law ====
A Scout is: – Un Escucha es:

- Trustworthy – Honrado
- Loyal – Leal
- Helpful – Servicial
- Friendly – Amigable
- Courteous – Cortés
- Kind – Bondadoso
- Obedient – Obediente
- Cheerful – Alegre
- Thrifty – Ahorrativo
- Brave – Valiente
- Clean – Limpio
- Reverent – Reverente

=== Guajataka Scout Reservation ===
Guajataka Scout Reservation or Camp Guajataka, often simply referred to as Guajataka and nicknamed Santuario de Amistad (English: Sanctuary of Friendship), is the Puerto Rico Council's only scout camp reservation. The camp is located at the northwest part of the island in San Sebastián and partially borders the southern portion of Guajataca Lake, from which the camp takes part of its name.

=== Order of the Arrow ===
Yokahu Lodge 506 is the Order of the Arrow Lodge of the Puerto Rico Council, founded in 1954 by Luis Matías Ferrer and Dr. Frank H. Wadsworth.

== Girl Scouts of the USA in Puerto Rico ==
=== Caribe Girl Scout Council ===
Caribe Girl Scout Council
- Map of Caribe Girl Scout Council and its campsites
- Owner: Girl Scouts of the USA
- Headquarters: San Juan, Puerto Rico
- Location: Puerto Rico
- Founded: 1926
- Executive Director: Ness Marie Tollinche
- Website cgspr.org

Girl Scouting in Puerto Rico is administered by the Caribe Girl Scout Council of the Girl Scouts of the USA. It is headquartered in San Juan. The first troop was formed in 1926 in Cabo Rojo by Elisa Colberg.

The Council owns Camp Elisa Colberg, established in 1948, in Rio Grande, Camp María Emilia in Añasco and Camp Provi Biaggi in Ponce. The Spanish translation of Girl Scout is Niña Escucha but it is also widely understood and used in English in Puerto Rico.

The council's newsletter is called Niña Escucha.

Girl Scouts earn a uniquely designed badge created by the council called Los Faros de Puerto Rico (The Lighthouses of Puerto Rico).

In 2006, painter Moisés Fragela donated one of his paintings entitled Quedo en Nada (Left in Nothing) to the Caribe Council which was sold in auction for funding part of the renovations and improvements towards the council's campsites.

In 2017, shortly after Hurricane Maria, 2,000 new members joined the Caribe Council.

== Gallery ==
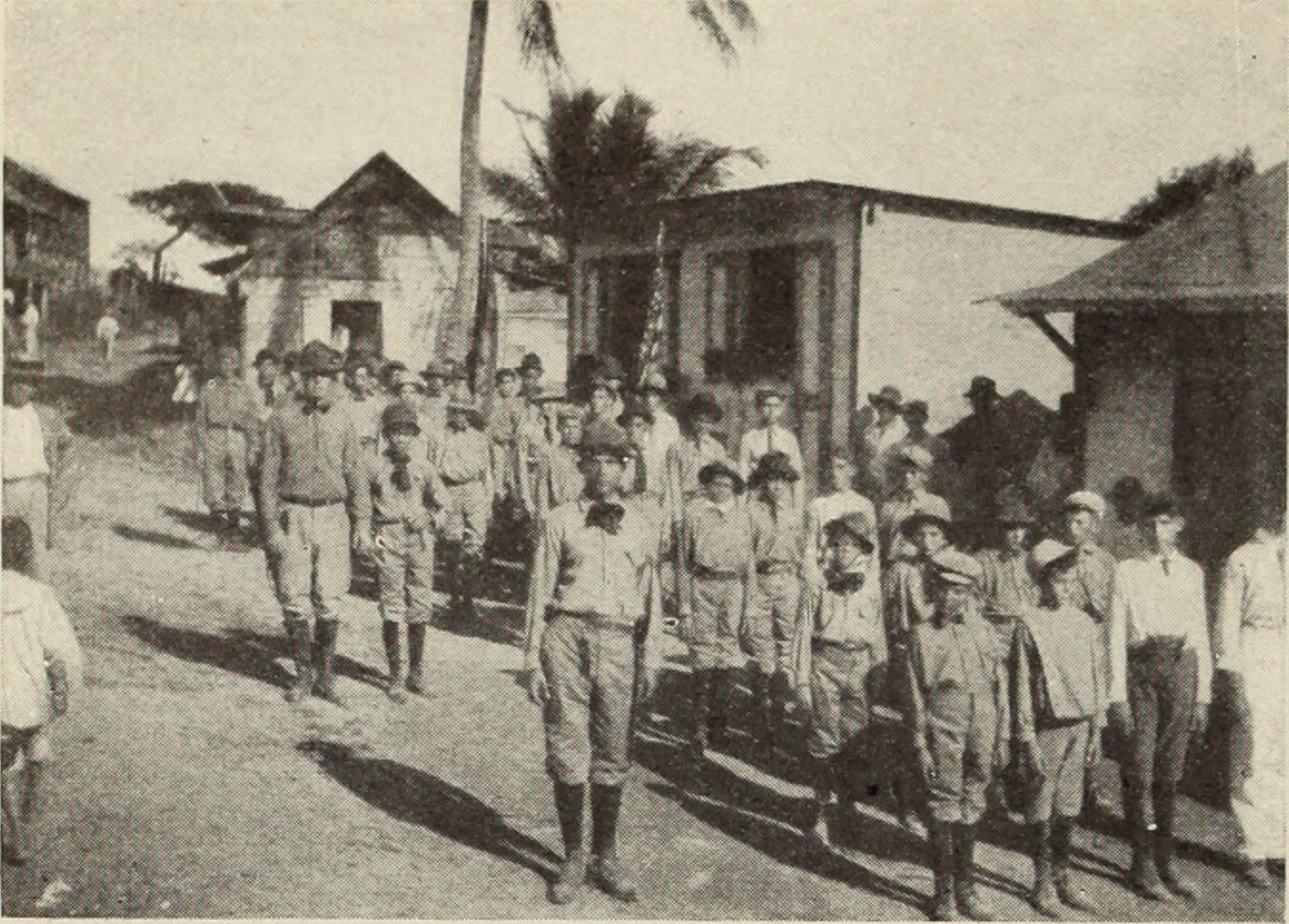
Boy Scouts of Porto Rico (c. 1911)

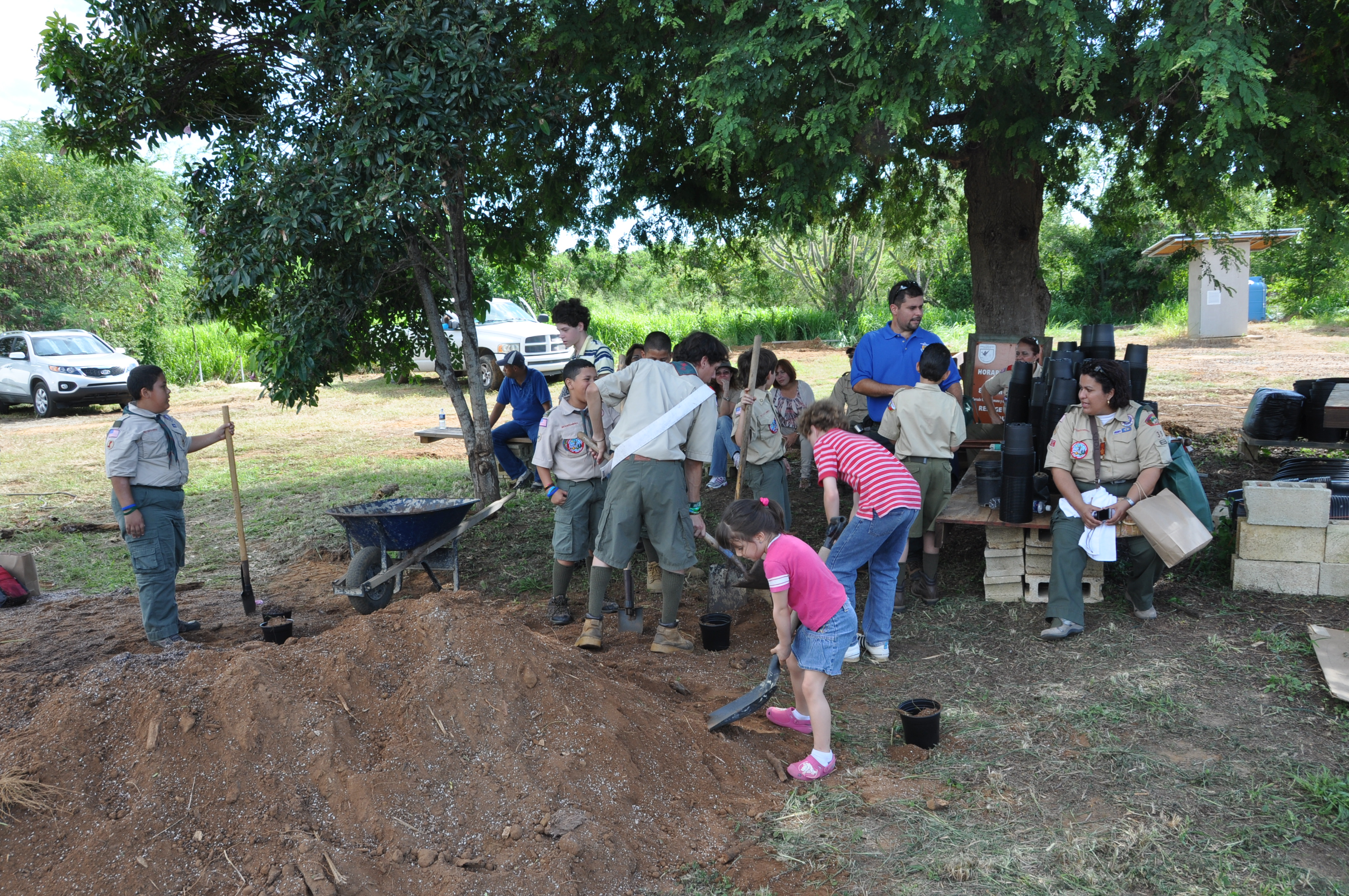
Scouts working on a service project

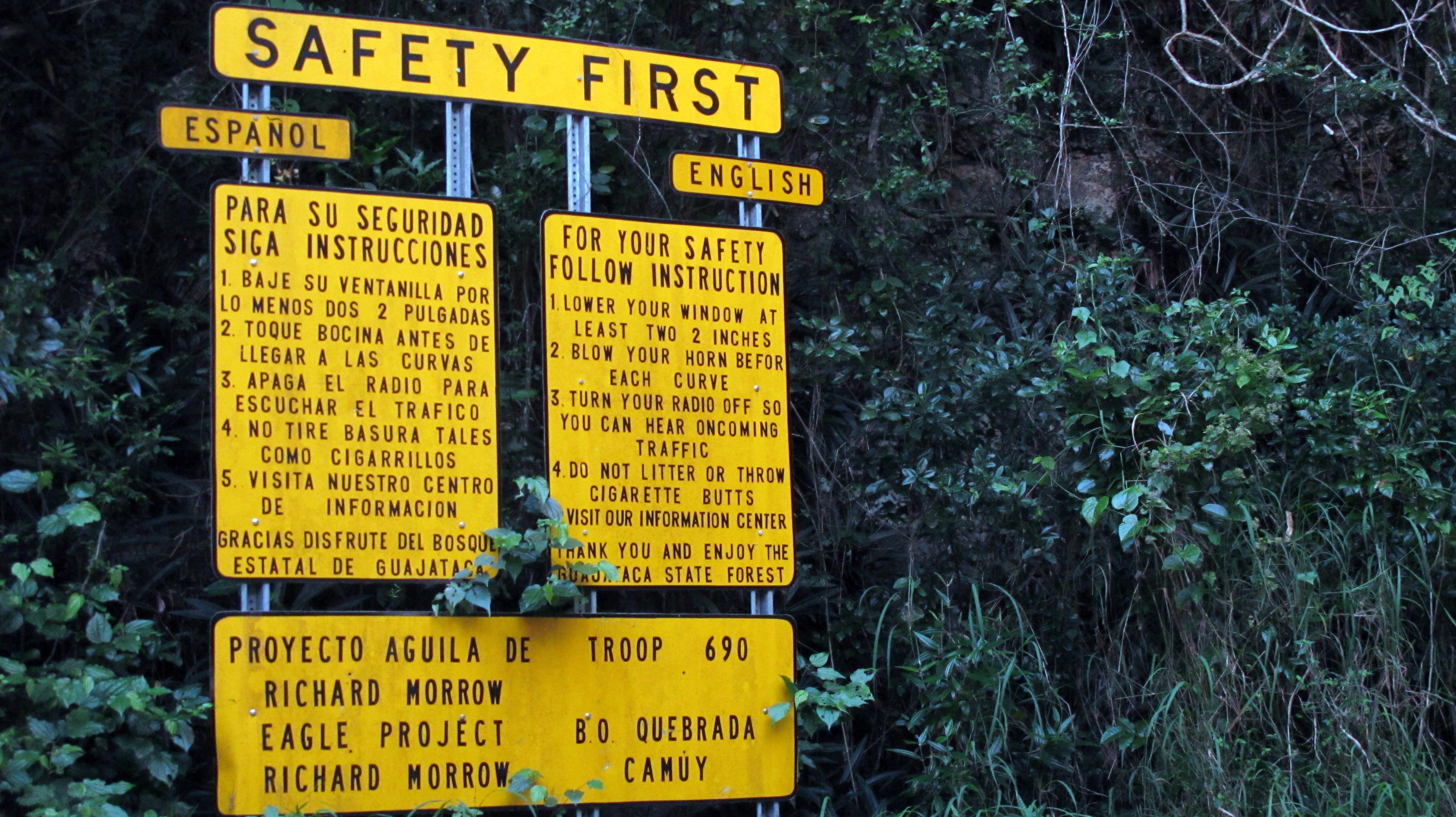
Eagle Project by Richard Morrow, safe driving tips sign for Puerto Rico's mountainous road(s)

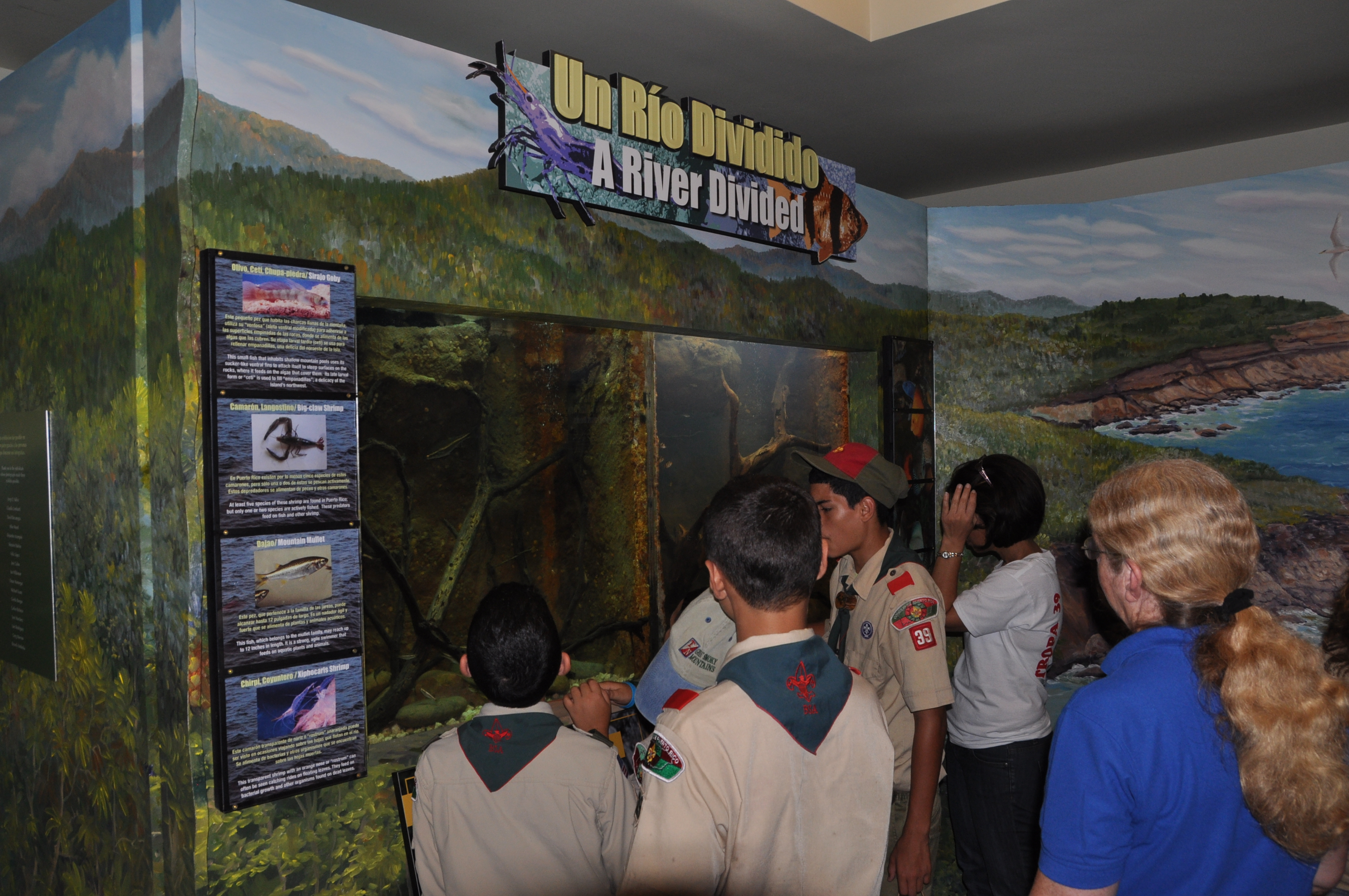
Scouts of the Boy Scouts program (Note: Now known as Scouts BSA.) attend the opening of the Caribbean National Wildlife Refuge Complex and Caribbean Ecological Service Field Office in Boquerón
