= Jobos =

Jobos may refer to:

== Places ==
- Jobos, Guayama, Puerto Rico, a barrio
- Jobos, Isabela, Puerto Rico, a barrio
- Jobos Beach, beach in Isabela, Puerto Rico
- Bahía de Jobos, protected estuary in Aguirre, Puerto Rico
