= Bajura, Isabela, Puerto Rico =

Barrio of Puerto Rico

Bajura
- Barrio
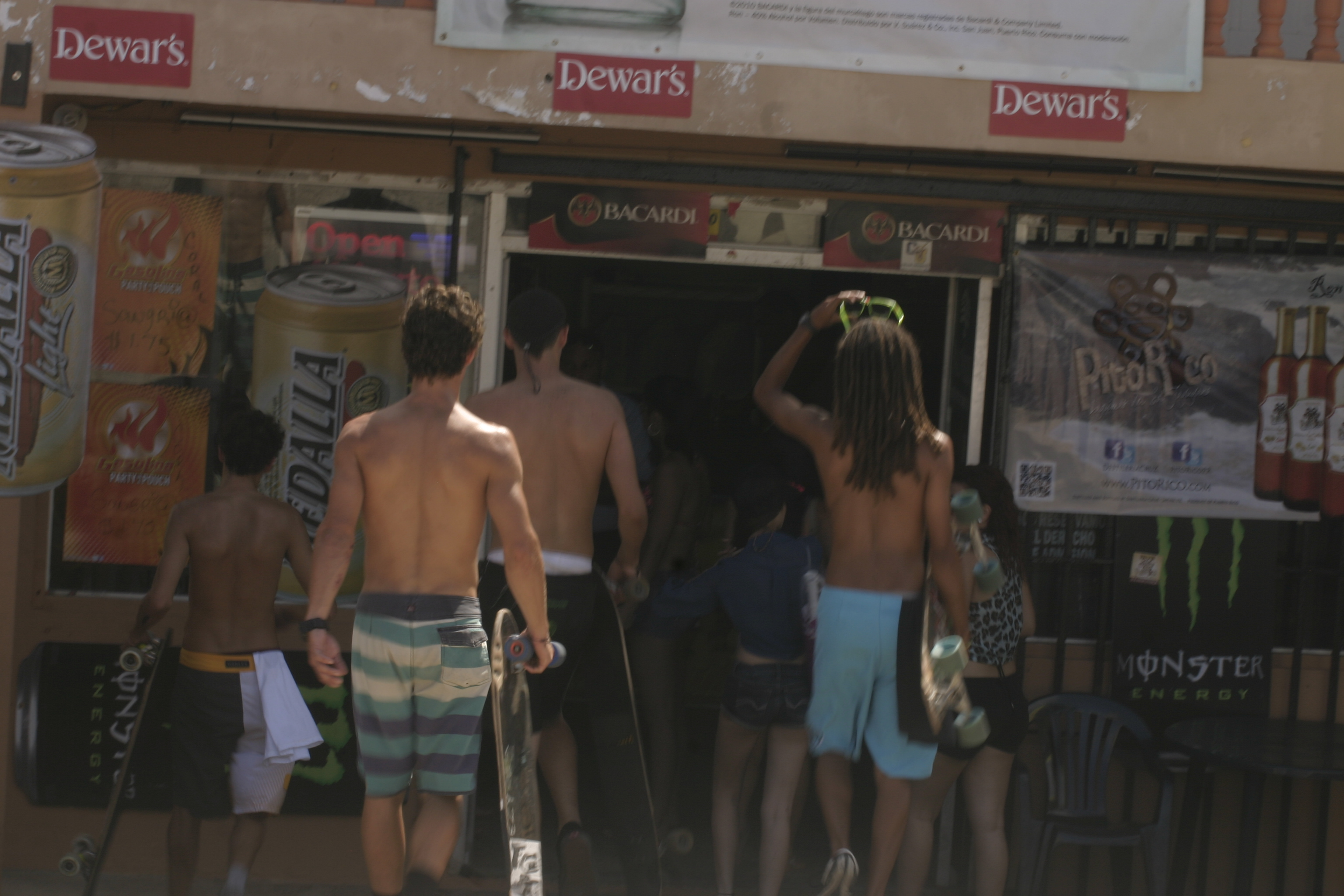
- At the Rip Curl contest in 2003 at Jobos Beach in Bajura

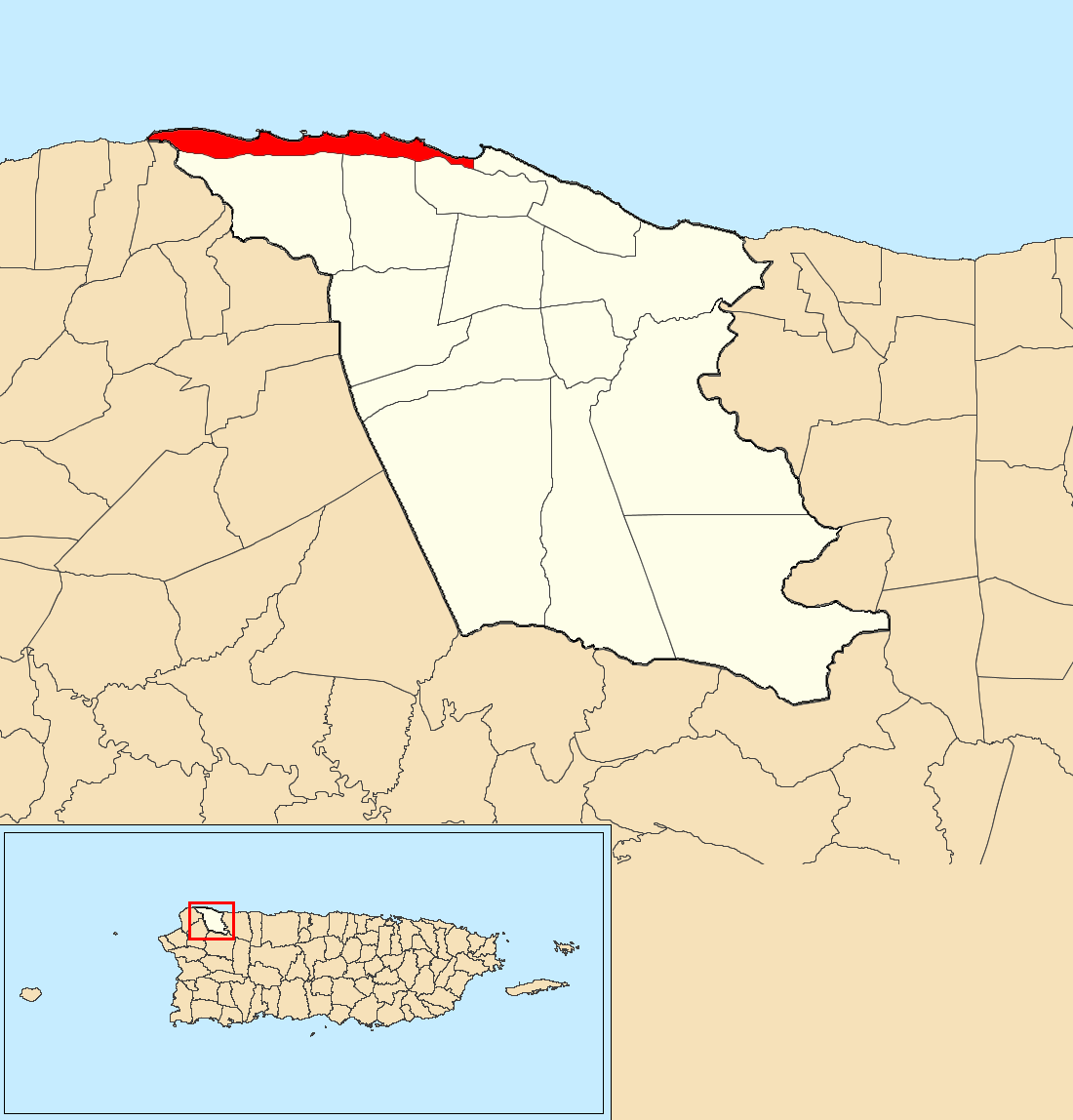
- Location of Bajura within the municipality of Isabela shown in red

- Location of Puerto Rico
- Coordinates: 18°30′42″N 67°03′53″W
- Commonwealth: Puerto Rico
- Municipality: Isabela

Area
  - Total: 4.89 sq mi (12.7 km^{2})
  - Land: 1.61 sq mi (4.2 km^{2})
  - Water: 3.28 sq mi (8.5 km^{2})
- Elevation: 7 ft (2.1 m)

Population (2010)
  - Total: 663
  - Density: 411.8/sq mi (159.0/km^{2})
- Source: 2010 Census
- Time zone: UTC−4 (AST)
- ZIP Code: 00662
- Area code: 787/939

Bajura is a barrio in the municipality of Isabela, Puerto Rico. Its population in 2010 was 663.

== History ==
Bajura was in Spain's gazetteers until Puerto Rico was ceded by Spain in the aftermath of the Spanish–American War under the terms of the Treaty of Paris of 1898 and became an unincorporated territory of the United States. In 1899, the United States Department of War conducted a census of Puerto Rico finding that the population of Bajura barrio was 647.

Historical population
Census	Pop.	Note	%±
1900	647		—
1910	745		15.1%
1920	713		−4.3%
1930	607		−14.9%
1940	718		18.3%
1950	732		1.9%
1960	542		−26.0%
1970	408		−24.7%
1980	400		−2.0%
1990	466		16.5%
2000	501		7.5%
2010	663		32.3%
U.S. Decennial Census; 1899 (shown as 1900) 1910-1930; 1930-1950 1980-2000 2010

== Gallery ==
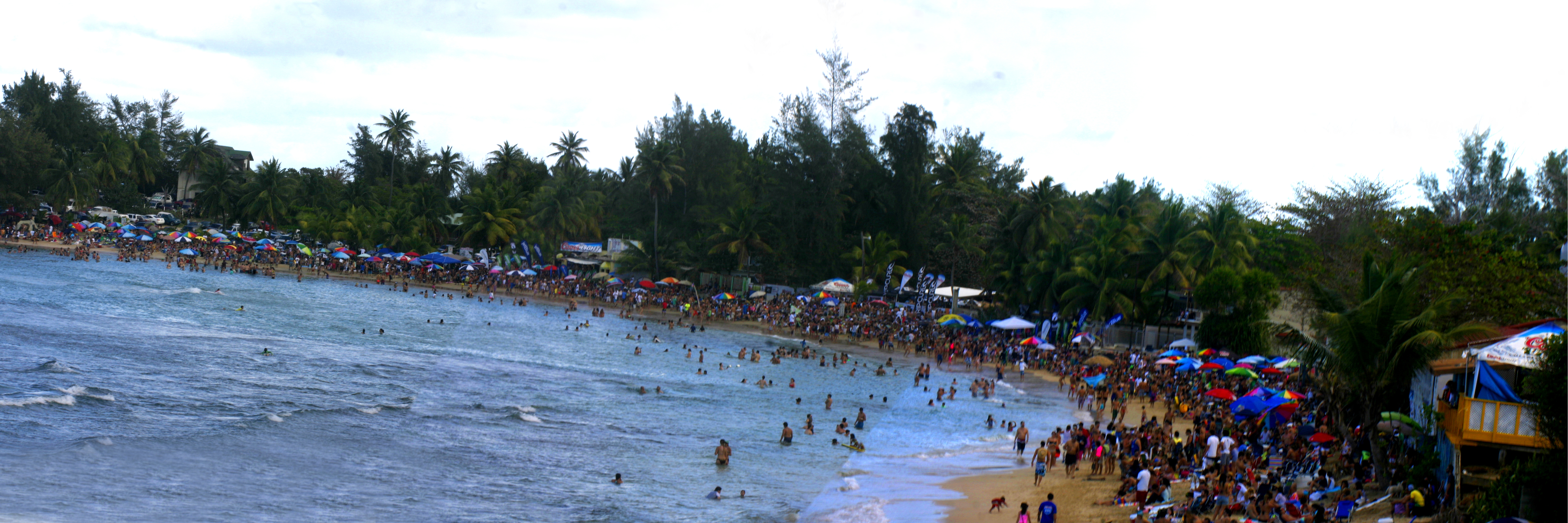
Surfing contest at Jobos Beach in Bajura

== See also ==
- List of communities in Puerto Rico
