= Galateo Bajo =

Barrio of Isabela, Puerto Rico

- Barrio
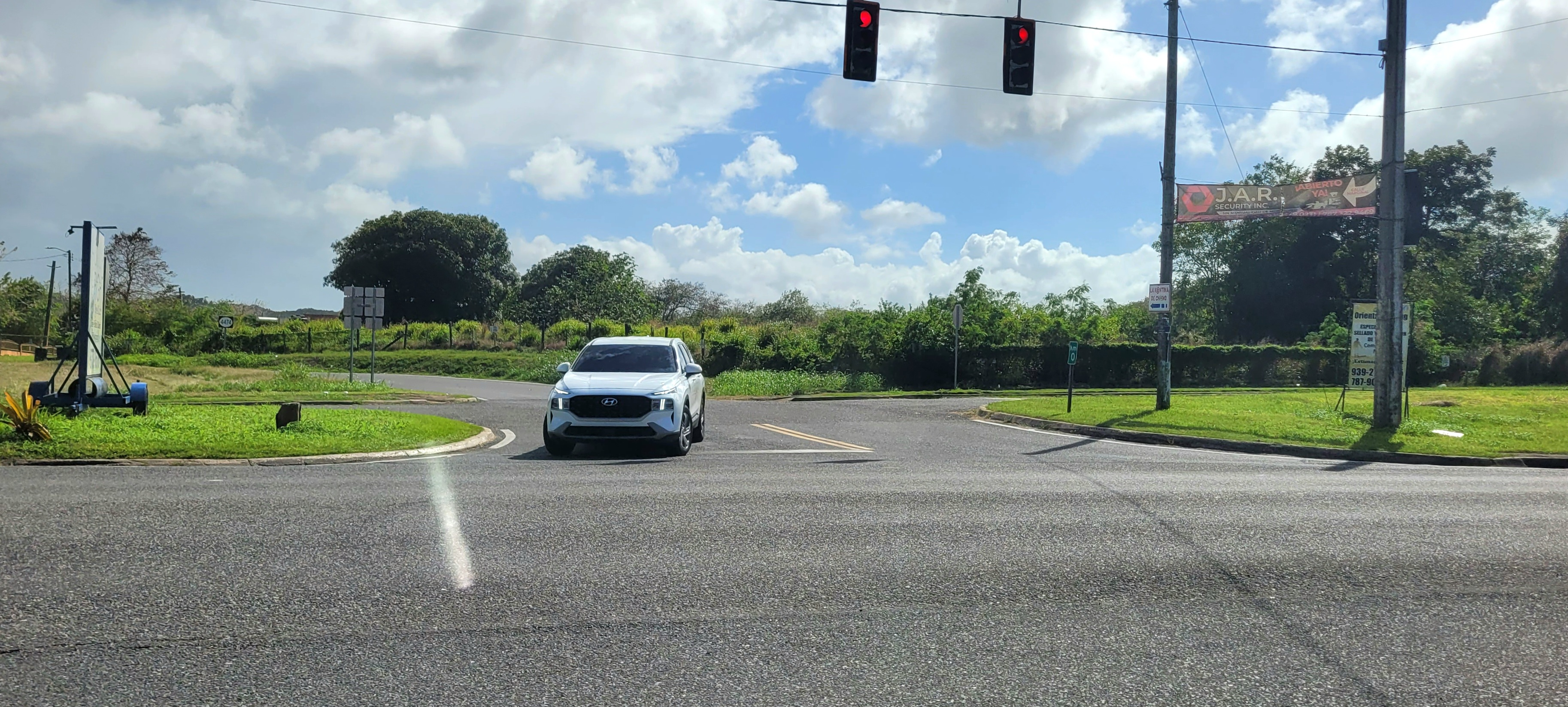
- Puerto Rico Highway 4474 in Galateo Bajo

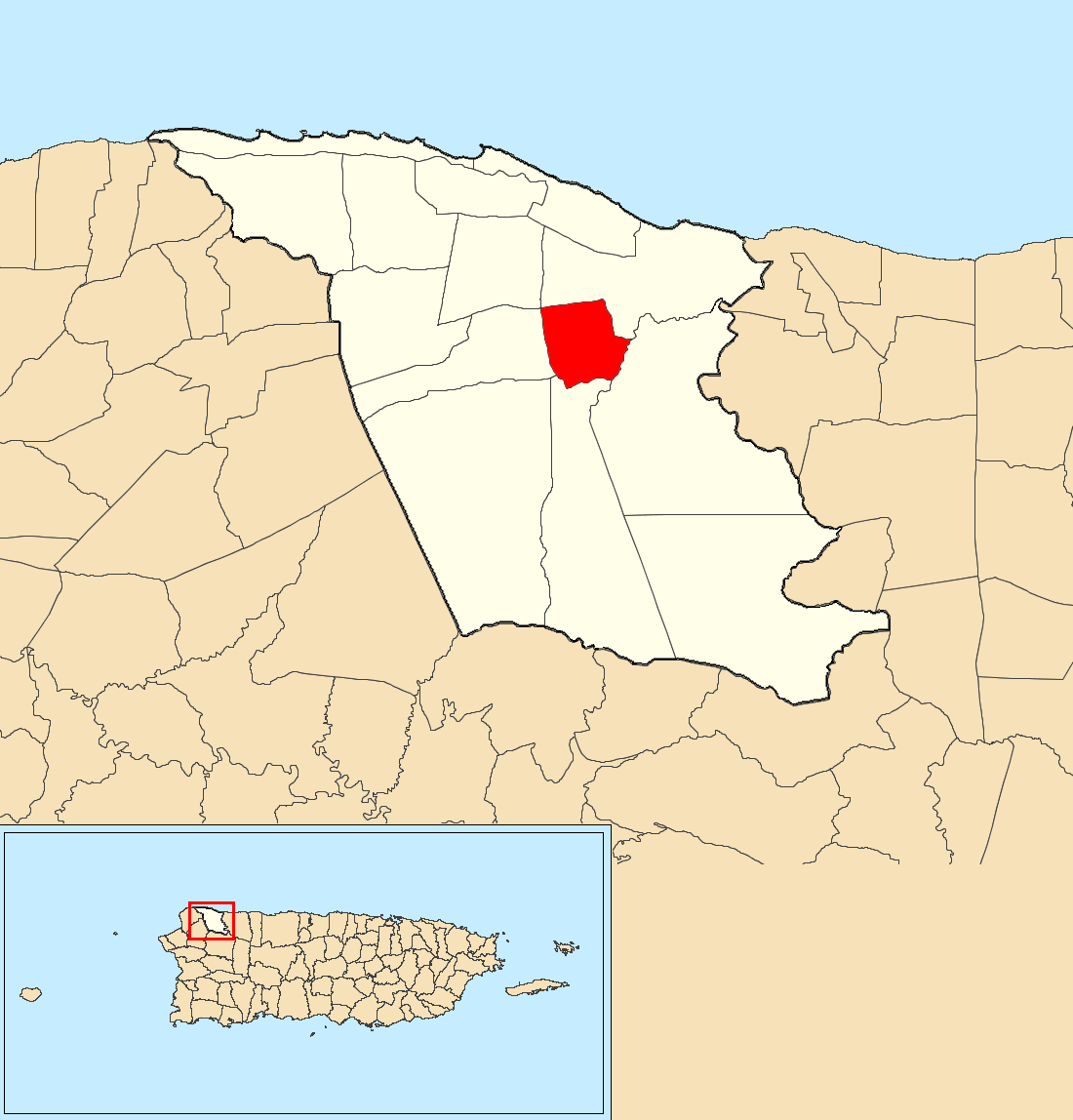
- Location of Galateo Bajo within the municipality of Isabela shown in red

- Location of Puerto Rico
- Coordinates: 18°27′45″N 66°59′59″W
- Commonwealth: Puerto Rico
- Municipality: Isabela

Area
  - Total: 1.47 sq mi (3.8 km^{2})
  - Land: 1.47 sq mi (3.8 km^{2})
  - Water: 0 sq mi (0 km^{2})
- Elevation: 397 ft (121 m)

Population (2010)
  - Total: 1,961
  - Density: 1,334/sq mi (515/km^{2})
- Source: 2010 Census
- Time zone: UTC−4 (AST)

Galateo Bajo is a barrio in the municipality of Isabela, Puerto Rico. Its population in 2010 was 1,961.

== History ==
Galateo Bajo was in Spain's gazetteers until Puerto Rico was ceded by Spain in the aftermath of the Spanish–American War under the terms of the Treaty of Paris of 1898 and became an unincorporated territory of the United States. In 1899, the United States Department of War conducted a census of Puerto Rico finding that the population of Galateo Bajo barrio was 705.

Historical population
| Census | Pop. | Note | %± |
|---|---|---|---|
| 1900 | 705 | | — |
| 1910 | 875 | | 24.1% |
| 1920 | 888 | | 1.5% |
| 1930 | 1,170 | | 31.8% |
| 1940 | 1,281 | | 9.5% |
| 1950 | 1,061 | | −17.2% |
| 1960 | 989 | | −6.8% |
| 1970 | 1,018 | | 2.9% |
| 1980 | 1,219 | | 19.7% |
| 1990 | 1,314 | | 7.8% |
| 2000 | 1,755 | | 33.6% |
| 2010 | 1,961 | | 11.7% |
U.S. Decennial Census; 1899 (shown as 1900) 1910-1930; 1930-1950 1980-2000 2010

== See also ==
- List of communities in Puerto Rico
