= Galateo Alto =

Barrio of Isabela, Puerto Rico

- Barrio
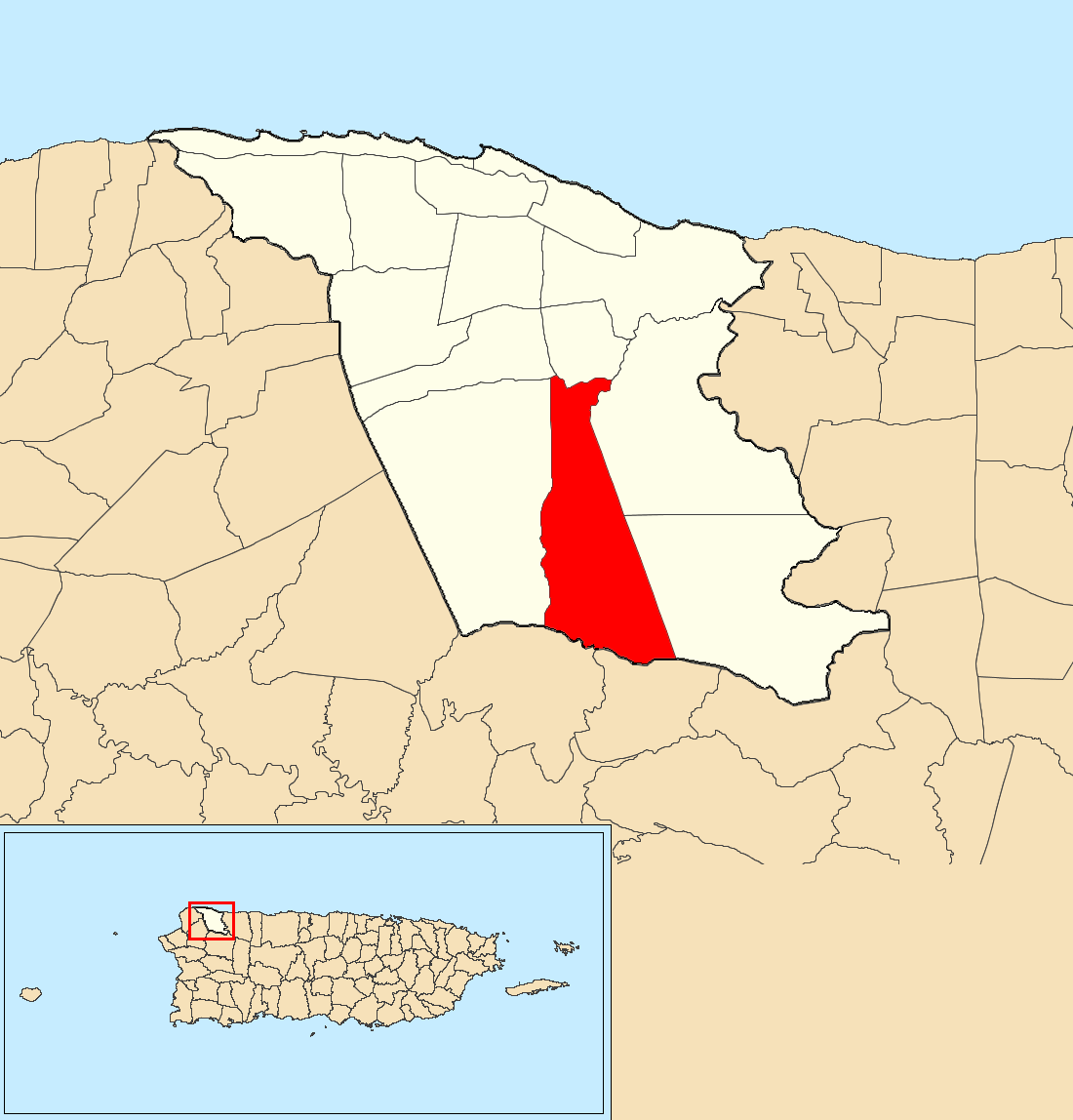
- Location of Galateo Alto within the municipality of Isabela shown in red

- Location of Puerto Rico
- Coordinates: 18°24′14″N 66°59′29″W
- Commonwealth: Puerto Rico
- Municipality: Isabela

Area
  - Total: 5.77 sq mi (14.9 km^{2})
  - Land: 5.77 sq mi (14.9 km^{2})
  - Water: 0 sq mi (0 km^{2})
- Elevation: 991 ft (302 m)

Population (2010)
  - Total: 1,314
  - Density: 228.1/sq mi (88.1/km^{2})
- Source: 2010 Census
- Time zone: UTC−4 (AST)

Galateo Alto is a barrio in the municipality of Isabela, Puerto Rico. Its population in 2010 was 1,314.

== History ==
Galateo Alto was in Spain's gazetteers until Puerto Rico was ceded by Spain in the aftermath of the Spanish–American War under the terms of the Treaty of Paris of 1898 and became an unincorporated territory of the United States. In 1899, the United States Department of War conducted a census of Puerto Rico, finding that the population of Galateo Alto barrio was 1,063.

Historical population
Census	Pop.	Note	%±
1900	1,063		—
1910	1,282		20.6%
1920	1,591		24.1%
1930	1,711		7.5%
1940	1,951		14.0%
1950	1,661		−14.9%
1960	1,507		−9.3%
1970	1,352		−10.3%
1980	1,501		11.0%
1990	1,173		−21.9%
2000	1,269		8.2%
2010	1,314		3.5%
U.S. Decennial Census; 1899 (shown as 1900) 1910-1930; 1930-1950 1980-2000 2010

== See also ==
- List of communities in Puerto Rico
