= Llanadas =

Barrio of Isabela, Puerto Rico

- Barrio
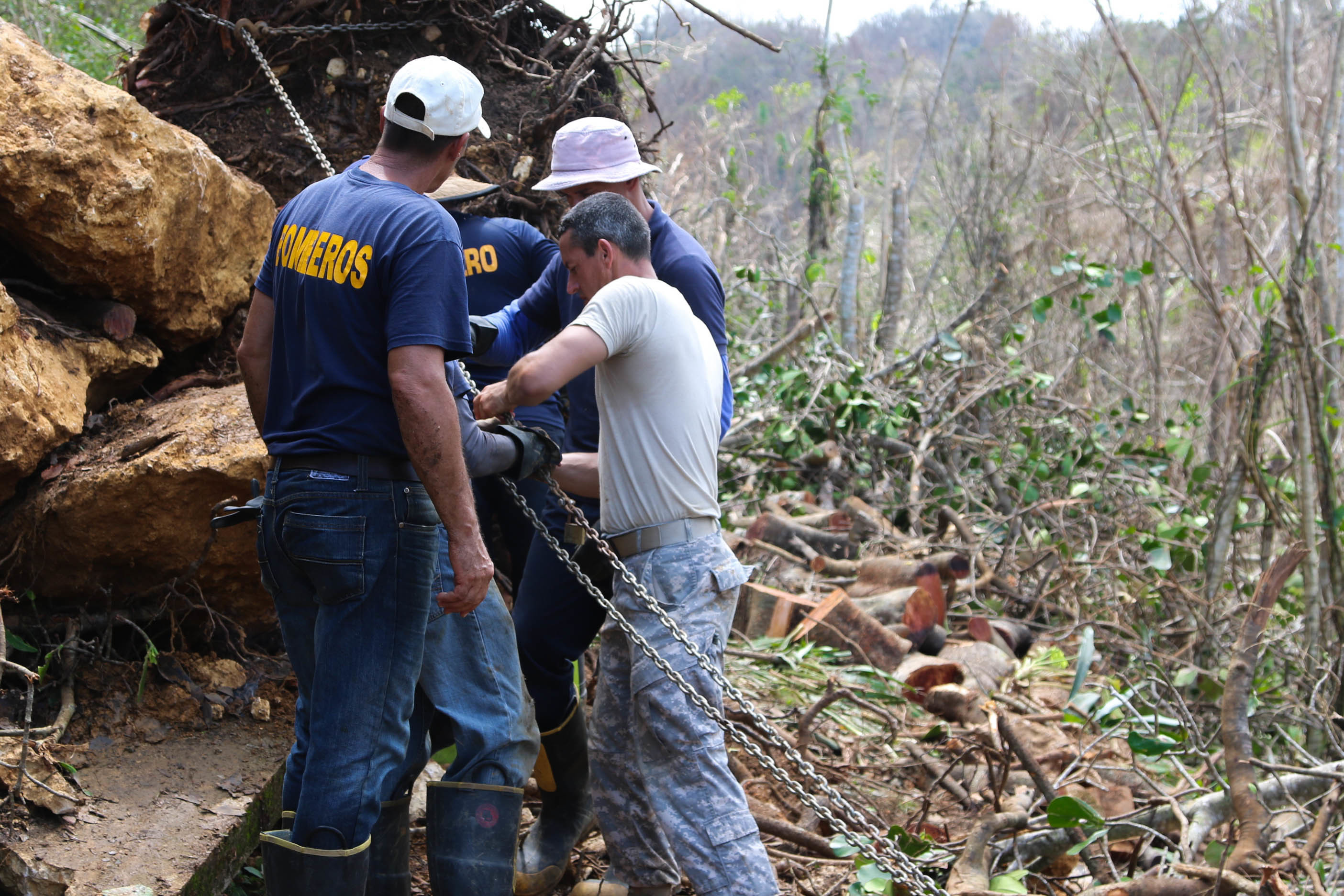
- Puerto Rico National Guard in Llanadas after Hurricane Maria

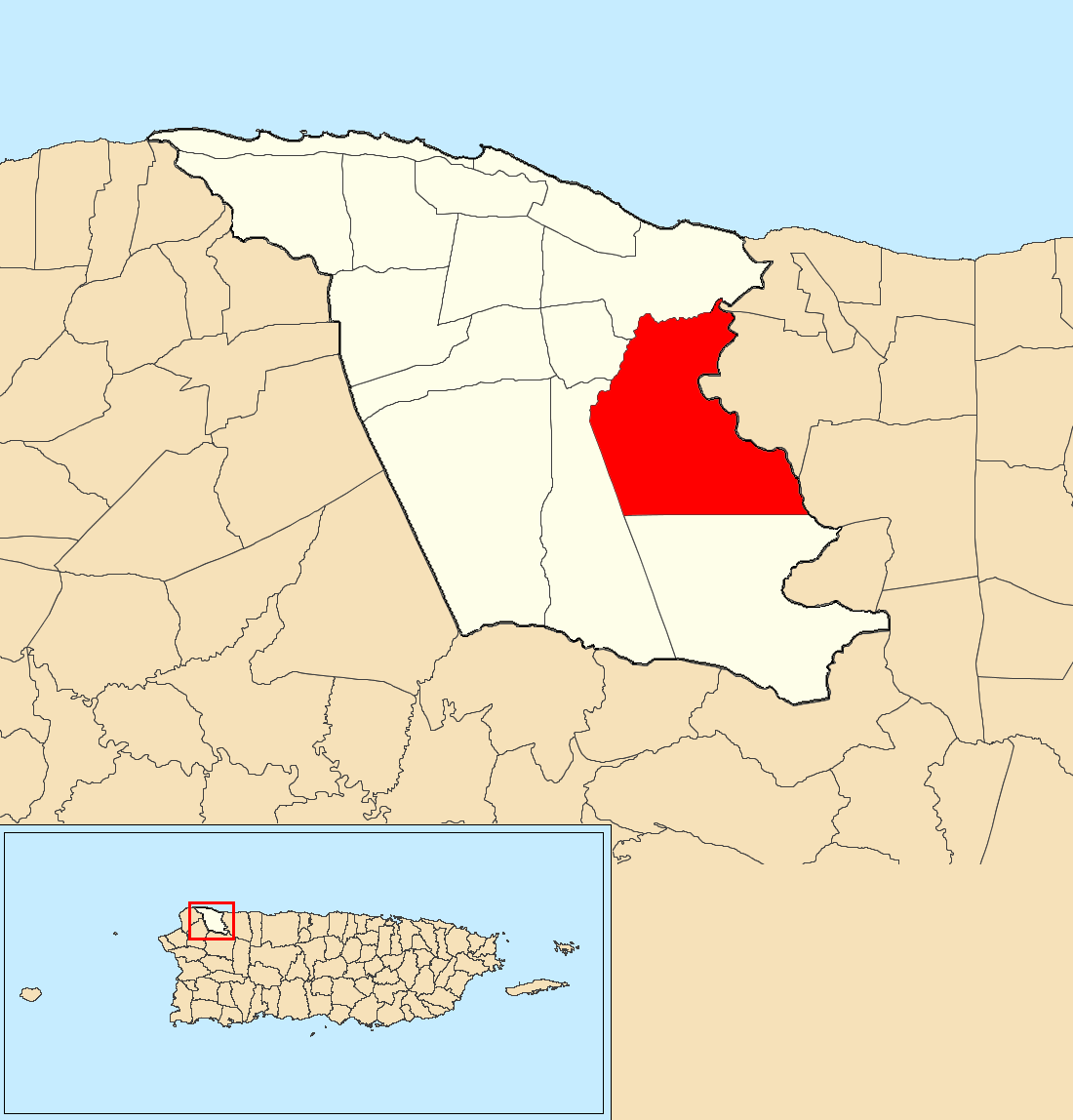
- Location of Llanadas within the municipality of Isabela shown in red

- Location of Puerto Rico
- Coordinates: 18°26′23″N 66°58′30″W
- Commonwealth: Puerto Rico
- Municipality: Isabela

Area
  - Total: 7.38 sq mi (19.1 km^{2})
  - Land: 7.37 sq mi (19.1 km^{2})
  - Water: 0.01 sq mi (0.026 km^{2})
- Elevation: 545 ft (166 m)

Population (2010)
  - Total: 2,315
  - Density: 314.5/sq mi (121.4/km^{2})
- Source: 2010 Census
- Time zone: UTC−4 (AST)

Llanadas is a barrio in the municipality of Isabela, Puerto Rico. Its population in 2010 was 2,315.

== History ==
Llanadas was in Spain's gazetteers until Puerto Rico was ceded by Spain in the aftermath of the Spanish–American War under the terms of the Treaty of Paris of 1898 and became an unincorporated territory of the United States. In 1899, the United States Department of War conducted a census of Puerto Rico finding that the population of Llanadas barrio was 1,564.

Historical population
Census	Pop.	Note	%±
1900	1,564		—
1910	1,648		5.4%
1920	1,896		15.0%
1930	2,095		10.5%
1940	2,431		16.0%
1950	2,540		4.5%
1960	2,378		−6.4%
1970	2,362		−0.7%
1980	2,791		18.2%
1990	2,345		−16.0%
2000	2,761		17.7%
2010	2,315		−16.2%
U.S. Decennial Census; 1899 (shown as 1900) 1910-1930; 1930-1950 1980-2000 2010

== Gallery ==
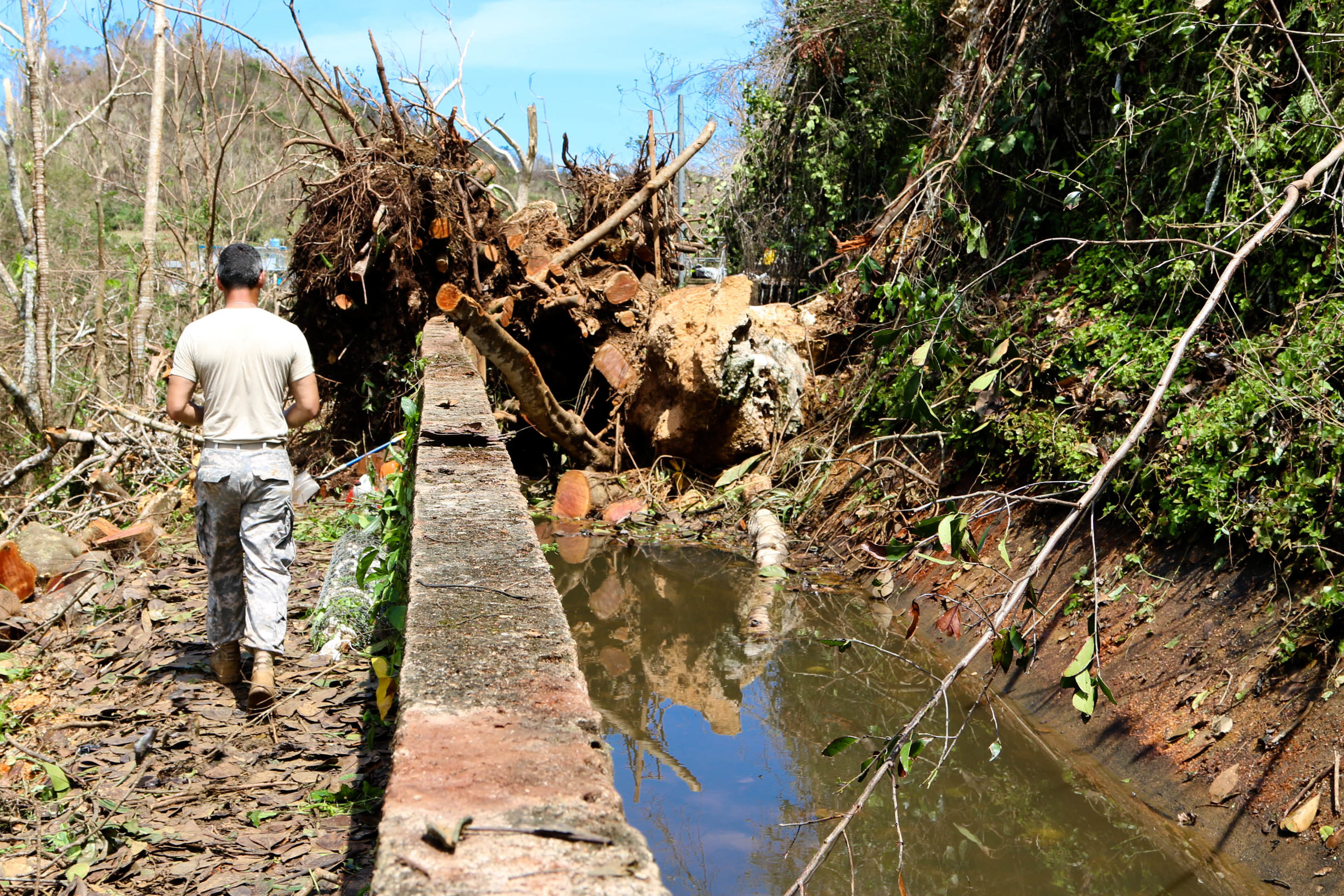
Work by Puerto Rico National Guard near Llanadas, Isabela after Hurricane Maria in 2017

== See also ==
- List of communities in Puerto Rico
