= Planas =

Barrio of Isabela, Puerto Rico

- Barrio
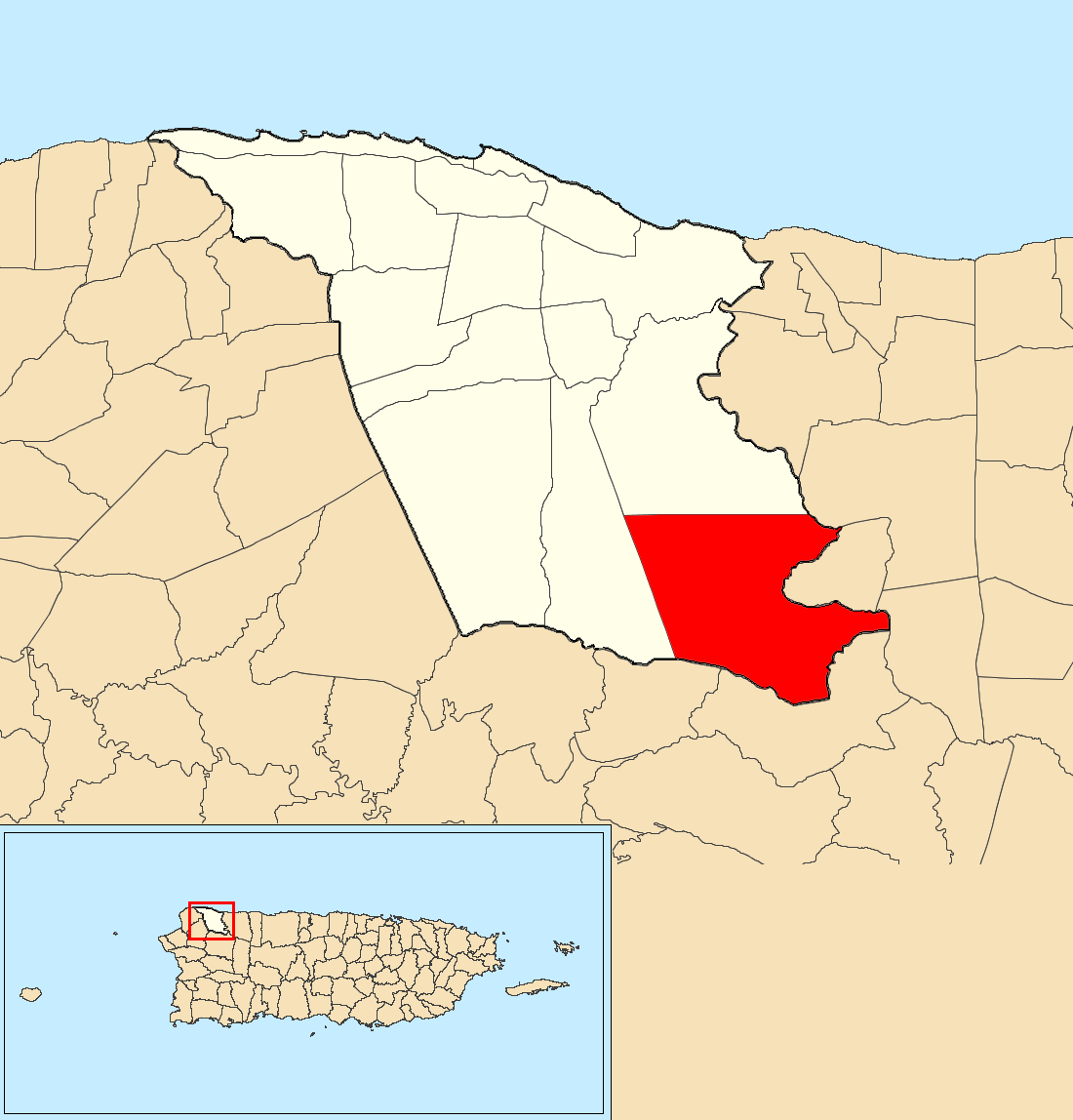
- Location of Planas within the municipality of Isabela shown in red

- Location of Puerto Rico
- Coordinates: 18°23′43″N 66°57′18″W
- Commonwealth: Puerto Rico
- Municipality: Isabela

Area
  - Total: 7.98 sq mi (20.7 km^{2})
  - Land: 7.94 sq mi (20.6 km^{2})
  - Water: 0.04 sq mi (0.10 km^{2})
- Elevation: 1,017 ft (310 m)

Population (2010)
  - Total: 2,075
  - Density: 261.7/sq mi (101.0/km^{2})
- Source: 2010 Census
- Time zone: UTC−4 (AST)

Planas is a barrio in the municipality of Isabela, Puerto Rico. Its population in 2010 was 2,075.

== History ==
Planas was in Spain's gazetteers until Puerto Rico was ceded by Spain in the aftermath of the Spanish–American War under the terms of the Treaty of Paris of 1898 and became an unincorporated territory of the United States. In 1899, the United States Department of War conducted a census of Puerto Rico finding that the population of Planas barrio was 936.

Historical population
Census	Pop.	Note	%±
1900	936		—
1910	1,018		8.8%
1920	1,588		56.0%
1930	2,011		26.6%
1940	2,020		0.4%
1950	2,078		2.9%
1960	1,806		−13.1%
1970	1,458		−19.3%
1980	1,695		16.3%
1990	1,644		−3.0%
2000	2,041		24.1%
2010	2,075		1.7%
U.S. Decennial Census; 1899 (shown as 1900) 1910-1930; 1930-1950 1980-2000 2010

== See also ==
- List of communities in Puerto Rico
