= Jobos, Isabela, Puerto Rico =

Barrio of Puerto Rico

Jobos
- Barrio
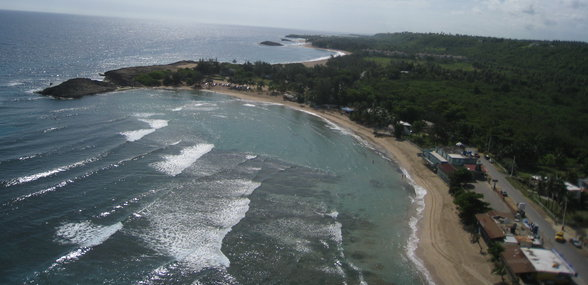
- Jobos Beach near Jobos

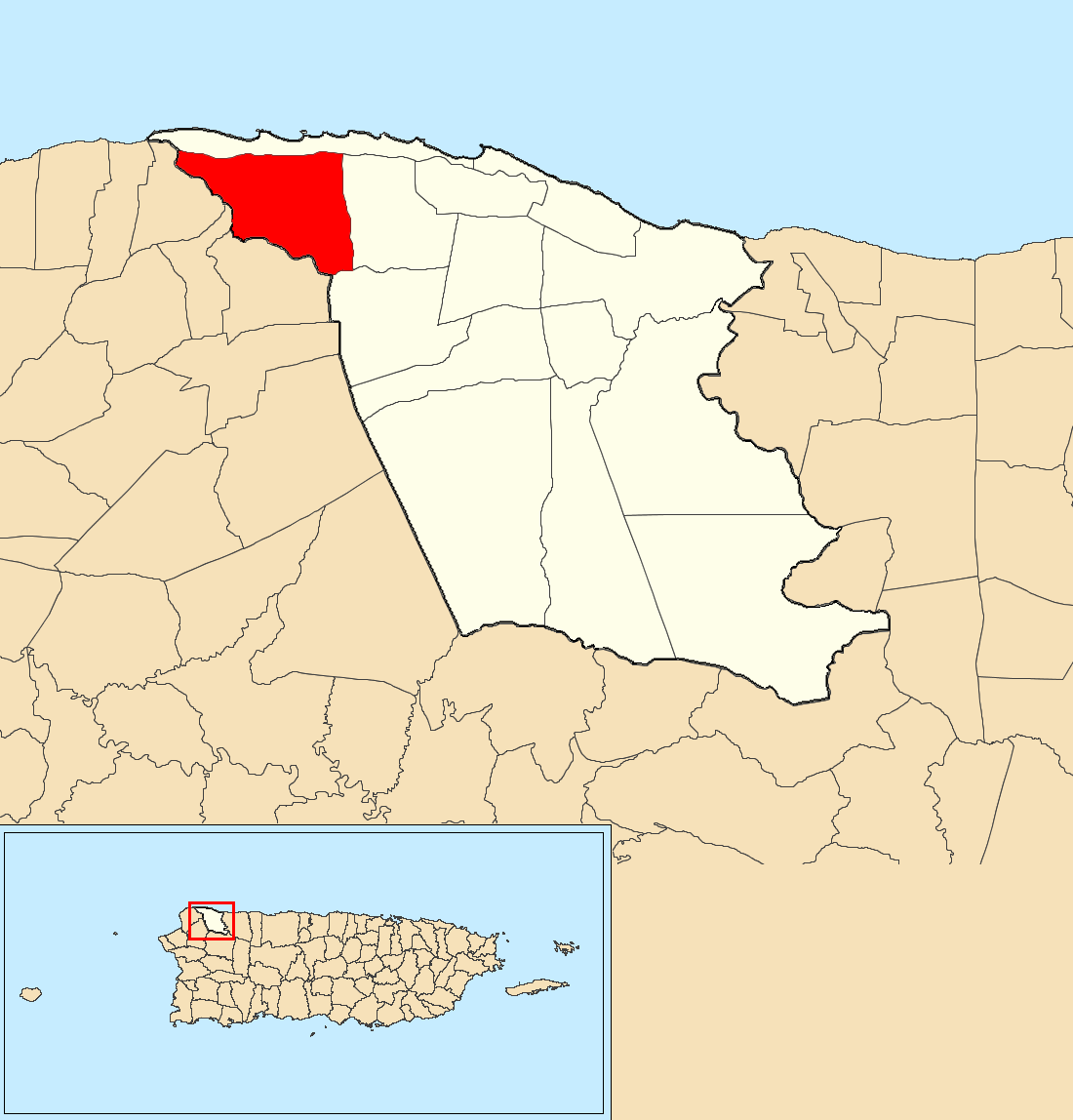
- Location of Jobos within the municipality of Isabela shown in red

- Location of Puerto Rico
- Coordinates: 18°29′50″N 67°03′56″W
- Commonwealth: Puerto Rico
- Municipality: Isabela

Area
  - Total: 3.55 sq mi (9.2 km^{2})
  - Land: 3.55 sq mi (9.2 km^{2})
  - Water: 0 sq mi (0 km^{2})
- Elevation: 239 ft (73 m)

Population (2010)
  - Total: 3,446
  - Density: 973.4/sq mi (375.8/km^{2})
- Source: 2010 Census
- Time zone: UTC−4 (AST)

Jobos is a barrio in the municipality of Isabela, Puerto Rico. Its population in 2010 was 3,446.

== History ==
Jobos was in Spain's gazetteers until Puerto Rico was ceded by Spain in the aftermath of the Spanish–American War under the terms of the Treaty of Paris of 1898 and became an unincorporated territory of the United States. In 1899, the United States Department of War conducted a census of Puerto Rico finding that the population of Jobos barrio was 1,551.

Historical population
Census	Pop.	Note	%±
1900	1,551		—
1910	1,571		1.3%
1920	1,738		10.6%
1930	1,745		0.4%
1940	1,726		−1.1%
1950	1,665		−3.5%
1960	1,786		7.3%
1970	2,098		17.5%
1980	2,584		23.2%
1990	2,818		9.1%
2000	3,534		25.4%
2010	3,446		−2.5%
U.S. Decennial Census; 1899 (shown as 1900) 1910-1930; 1930-1950 1980-2000 2010

== Places in Jobos ==
In 2019, the headquarters for Solar Libre, a new school where students can study solar energy, was established in Jobos. It was established with financial support from Samsung, The Hispanic Federation and NFL football player, Victor Cruz.

Jobos Beach, known as a world-class surf spot and where in February 2013, the Rip Curl Pro surfing competition was held, is located in Jobos barrio.

There is a cemetery in Jobos.

== Gallery ==
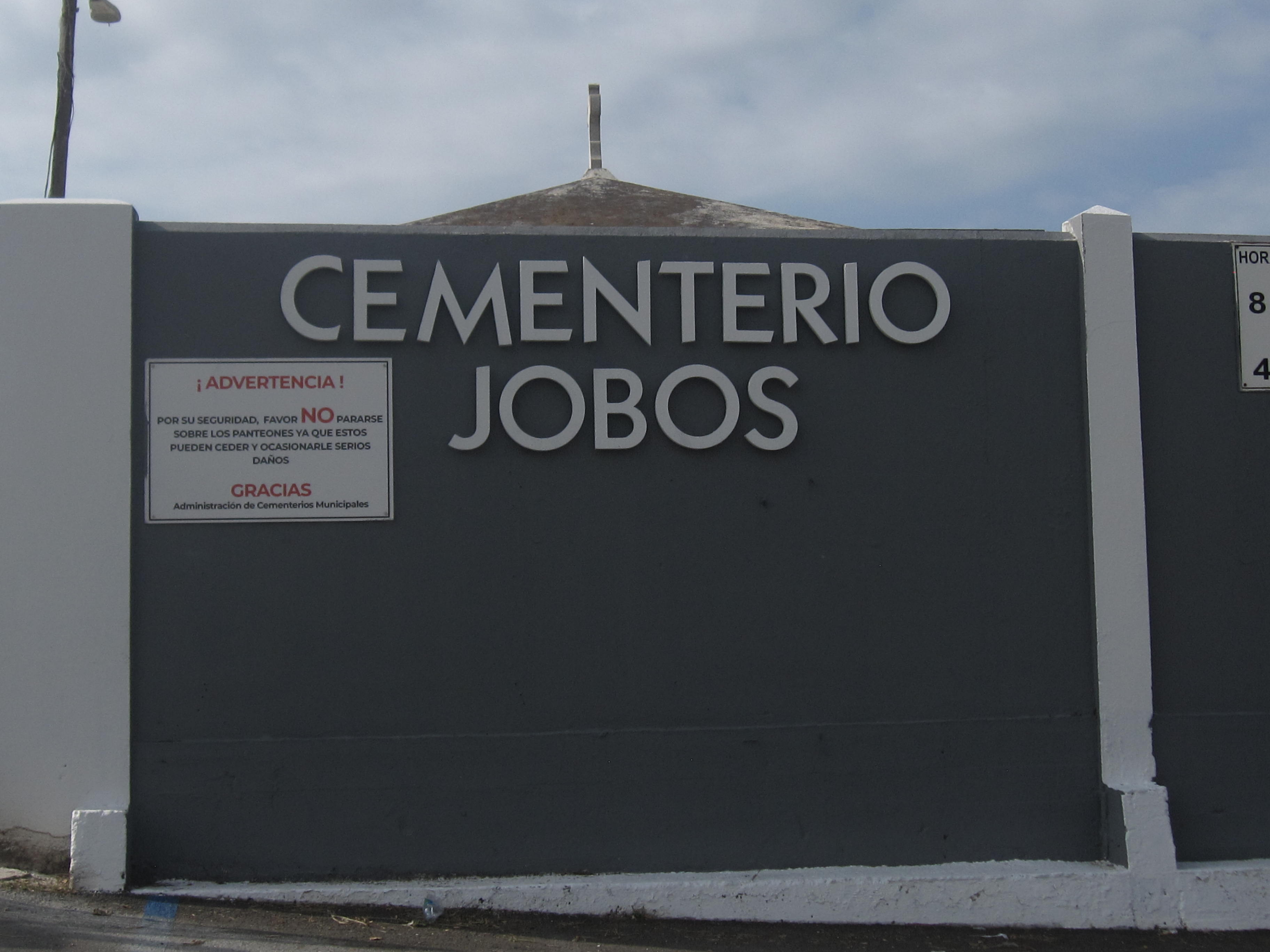
Cemetery in Jobos

== See also ==
- List of communities in Puerto Rico
