= Arenales Altos =

Barrio of Isabela, Puerto Rico

- Barrio
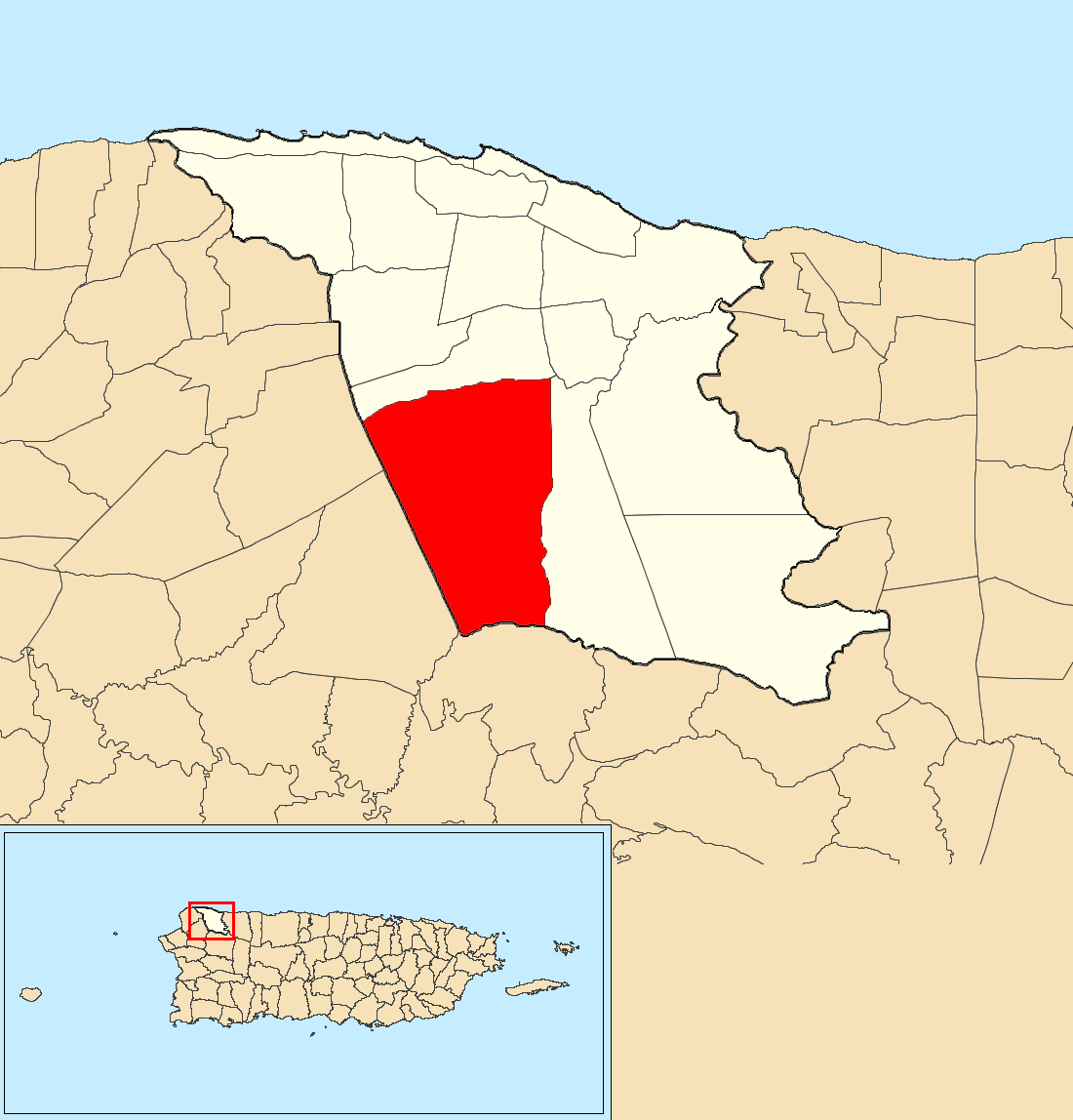
- Location of Arenales Altos within the municipality of Isabela shown in red

- Location of Puerto Rico
- Coordinates: 18°25′46″N 67°01′04″W
- Commonwealth: Puerto Rico
- Municipality: Isabela

Area
  - Total: 9.19 sq mi (23.8 km^{2})
  - Land: 9.19 sq mi (23.8 km^{2})
  - Water: 0 sq mi (0 km^{2})
- Elevation: 650 ft (200 m)

Population (2010)
  - Total: 4,101
  - Density: 446.2/sq mi (172.3/km^{2})
- Source: 2010 Census
- Time zone: UTC−4 (AST)

Arenales Altos is a barrio in the municipality of Isabela, Puerto Rico. Its population in 2010 was 4,101.

== History ==
Arenales Altos was in Spain's gazetteers until Puerto Rico was ceded by Spain in the aftermath of the Spanish–American War under the terms of the Treaty of Paris of 1898 and became an unincorporated territory of the United States. In 1899, the United States Department of War conducted a census of Puerto Rico finding that the population of Arenales Altos barrio was 1,559.

Historical population
Census	Pop.	Note	%±
1900	1,559		—
1910	1,706		9.4%
1920	2,188		28.3%
1930	2,353		7.5%
1940	2,497		6.1%
1950	2,616		4.8%
1960	2,364		−9.6%
1970	2,171		−8.2%
1980	2,527		16.4%
1990	2,965		17.3%
2000	3,677		24.0%
2010	4,101		11.5%
U.S. Decennial Census; 1899 (shown as 1900) 1910-1930; 1930-1950 1980-2000 2010

== See also ==
- List of communities in Puerto Rico
