= Pozo de Jacinto =

Pit cave in Isabela, Puerto Rico

Coordinates: 18.515000°N 67.073877°W

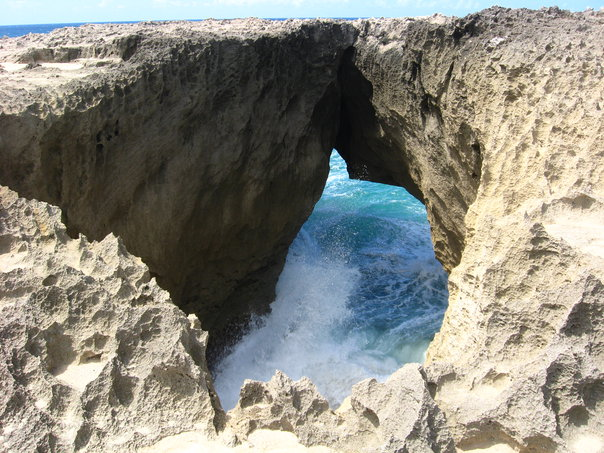
Pozo de Jacinto, Barrio Bajura, Isabela, Puerto Rico

Pozo de Jacinto (Jacinto's Pit Cave) is a blowhole located at Barrio Bajuras in the northwestern side Puerto Rican municipality of Isabela on Puerto Rico Highway 466.

== Description ==
Pozo de Jacinto is at Barrio Bajura which is near Crash Boat Beach in Aguadilla, which borders Isabela. It's a blowhole, or limestone rock with an orifice through which ocean waves shoot up.

== Folklore ==
A jíbaro named Jacinto often went near the cave to eat his lunch, keeping the cow's leash tied around his waist. One day, loud thunder scared the cow and he ran, fell down the pit pulling Jacinto with him and both drowned. If Jacinto's name is called and mention of the cow is made, the ocean becomes furious and churns wildly in response.

== See also ==
- Folklore of Puerto Rico
- Barrio Bajuras
- Jobos Beach
