= Bejucos =

Barrio of Isabela, Puerto Rico

- Barrio
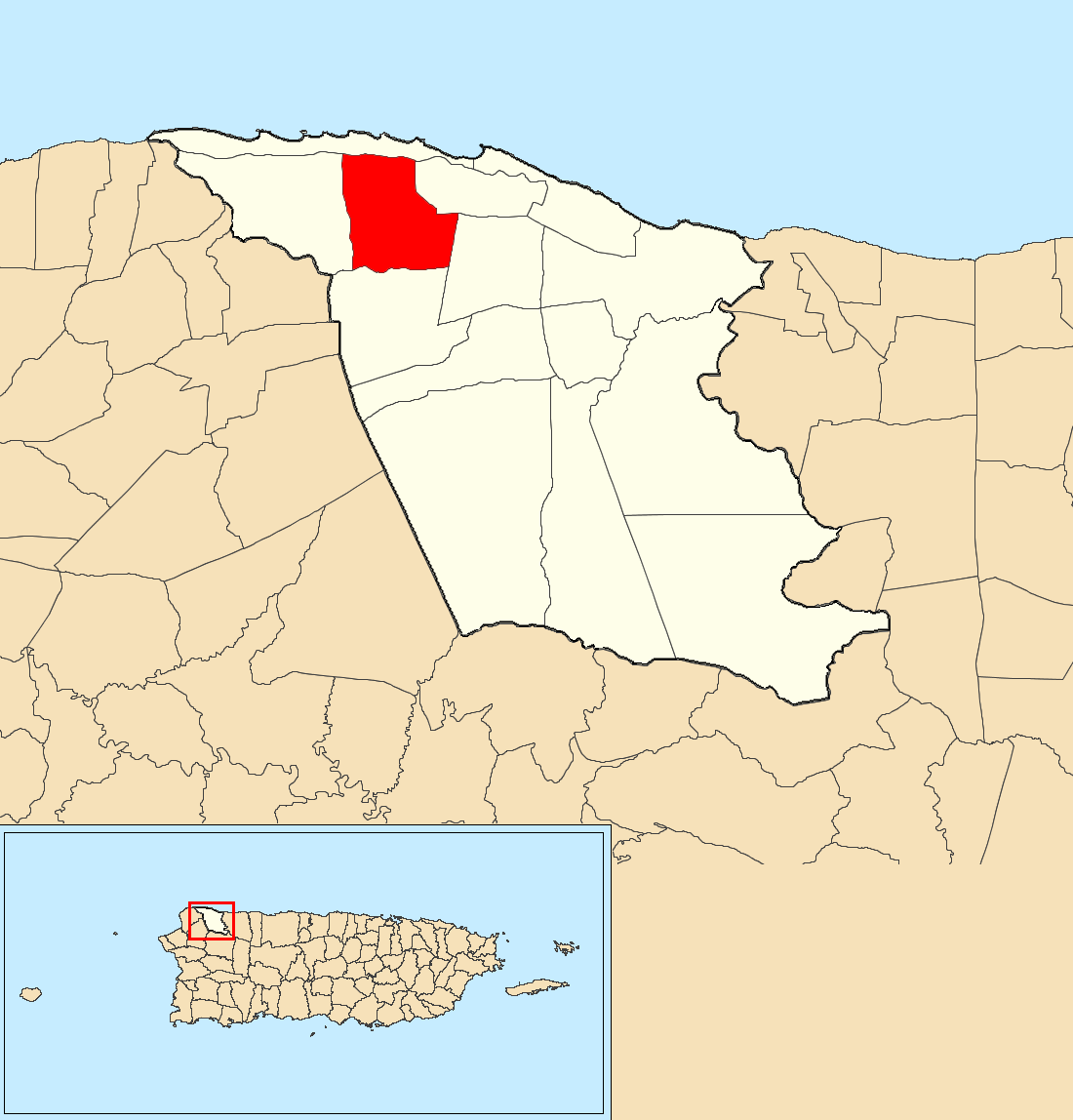
- Location of Bejucos within the municipality of Isabela shown in red

- Location of Puerto Rico
- Coordinates: 18°29′35″N 67°02′37″W
- Commonwealth: Puerto Rico
- Municipality: Isabela

Area
  - Total: 2.69 sq mi (7.0 km^{2})
  - Land: 2.69 sq mi (7.0 km^{2})
  - Water: 0 sq mi (0 km^{2})
- Elevation: 305 ft (93 m)

Population (2010)
  - Total: 5,055
  - Density: 1,879.2/sq mi (725.6/km^{2})
- Source: 2010 Census
- Time zone: UTC−4 (AST)

Bejucos is a barrio in the municipality of Isabela, Puerto Rico. Its population in 2010 was 5,055.

== History ==
Bejucos was in Spain's gazetteers until Puerto Rico was ceded by Spain in the aftermath of the Spanish–American War under the terms of the Treaty of Paris of 1898 and became an unincorporated territory of the United States. In 1899, the United States Department of War conducted a census of Puerto Rico finding that the population of Bejucos barrio was 1,257.

Historical population
Census	Pop.	Note	%±
1900	1,257		—
1910	1,370		9.0%
1920	1,645		20.1%
1930	2,118		28.8%
1940	2,313		9.2%
1950	1,907		−17.6%
1960	2,169		13.7%
1970	0		−100.0%
1980	2,498		—
1990	1,980		−20.7%
2000	3,056		54.3%
2010	5,055		65.4%
2020	5,099		0.9%
U.S. Decennial Census; 1899 (shown as 1900) 1910-1930; 1930-1950 1980-2000 2010

== See also ==
- List of communities in Puerto Rico
