= Isabela, Puerto Rico =

Town and municipality in Puerto Rico

Isabela Municipio de Isabela
- Town and Municipality
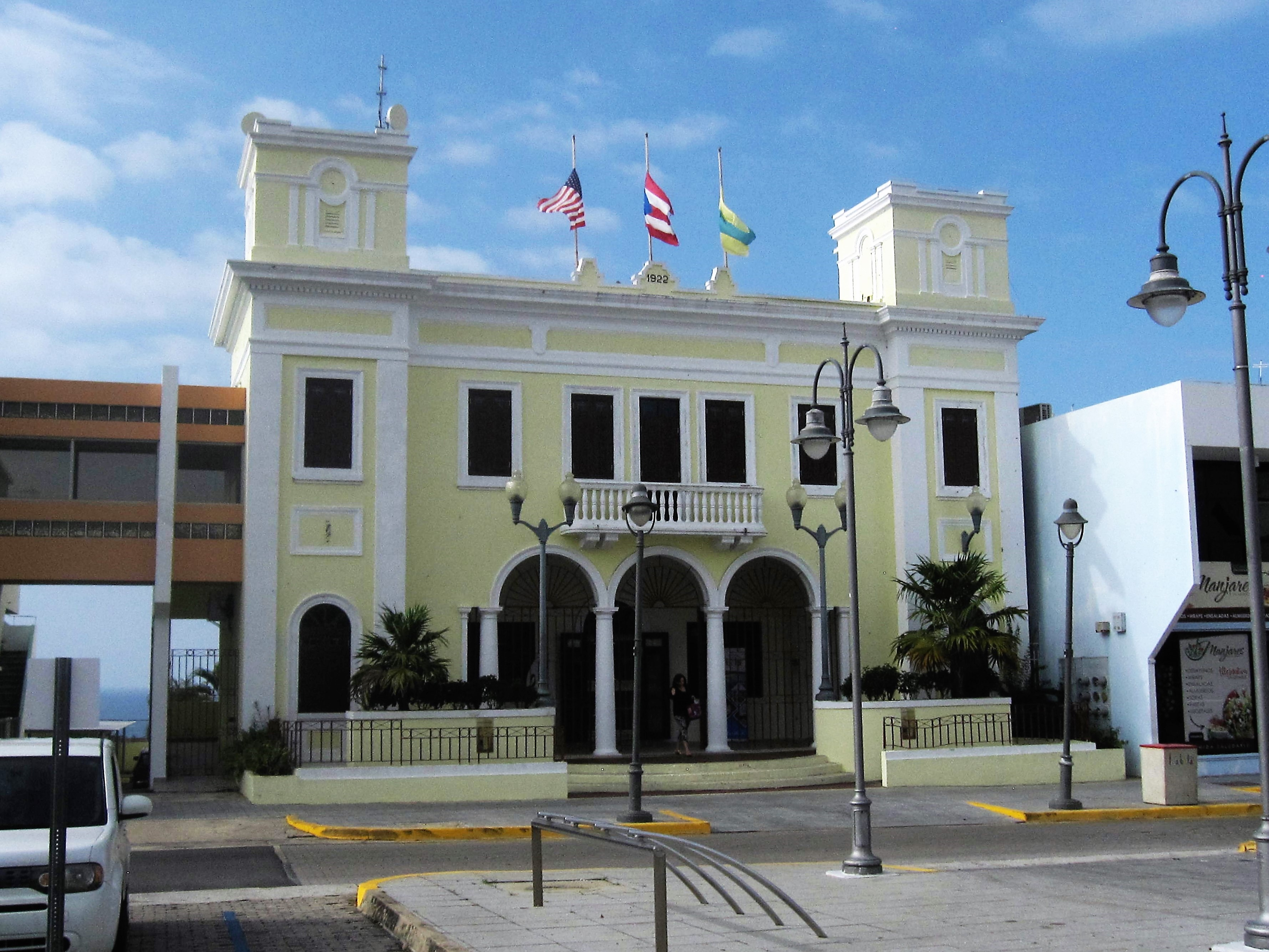
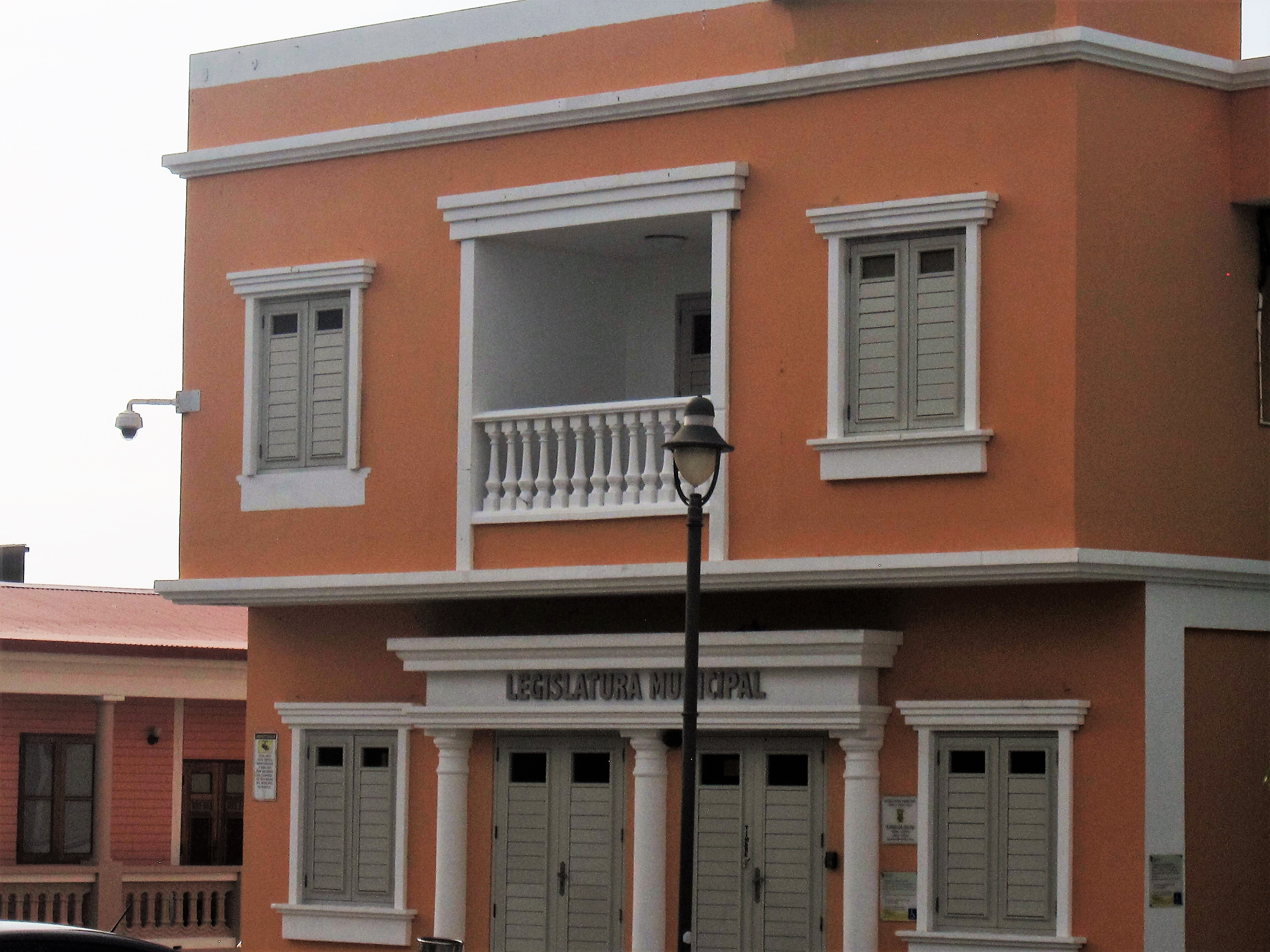
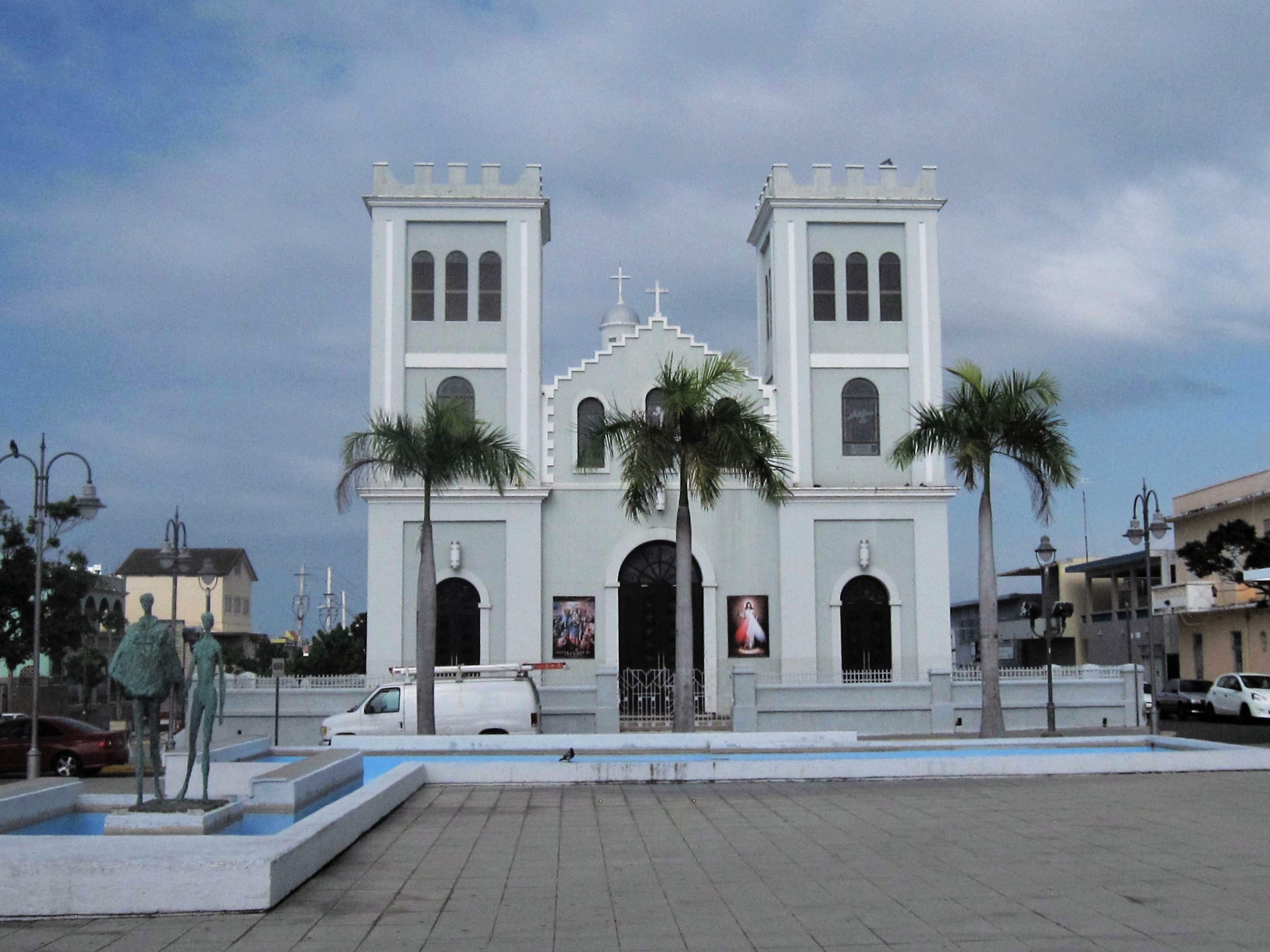
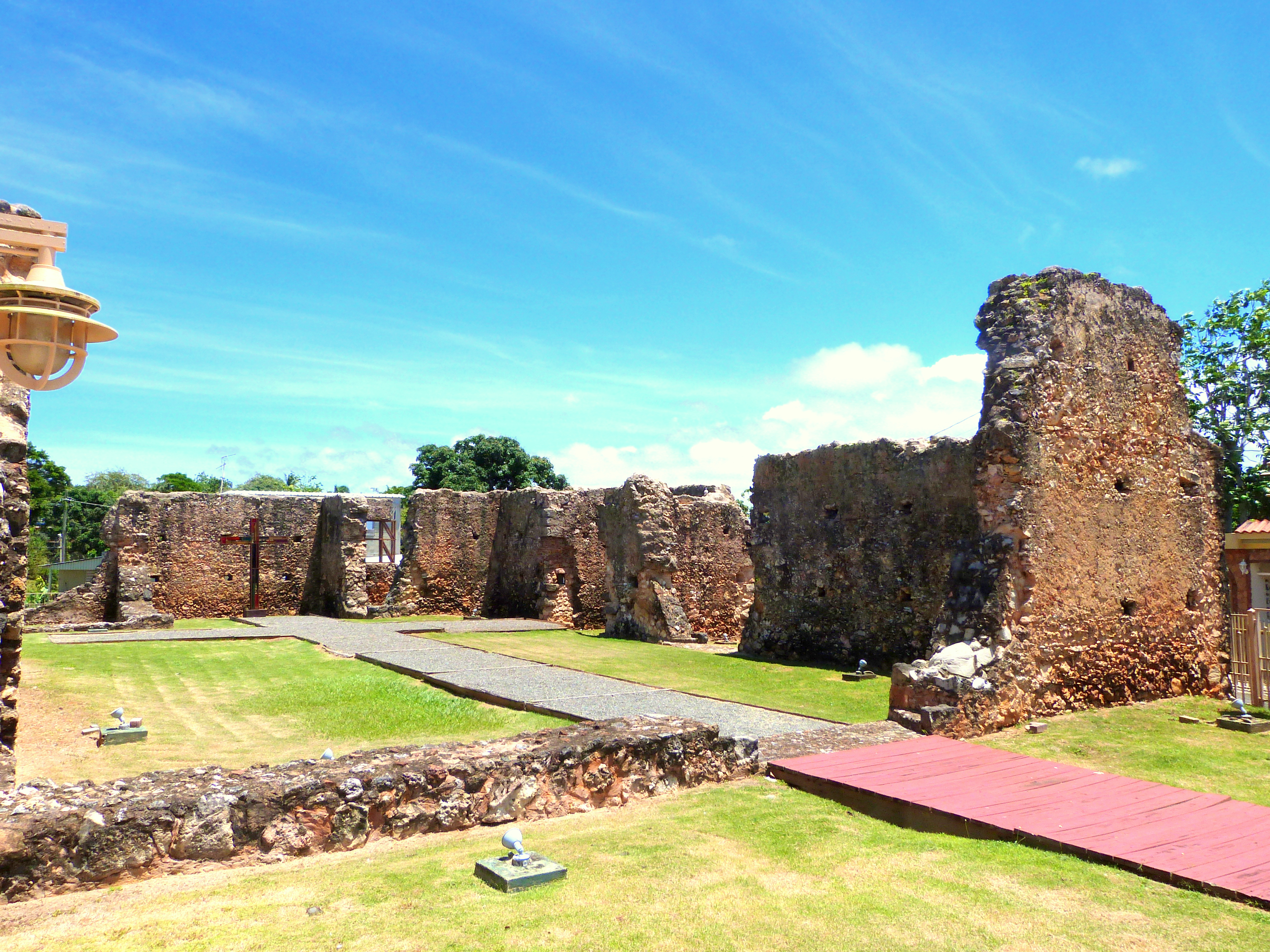
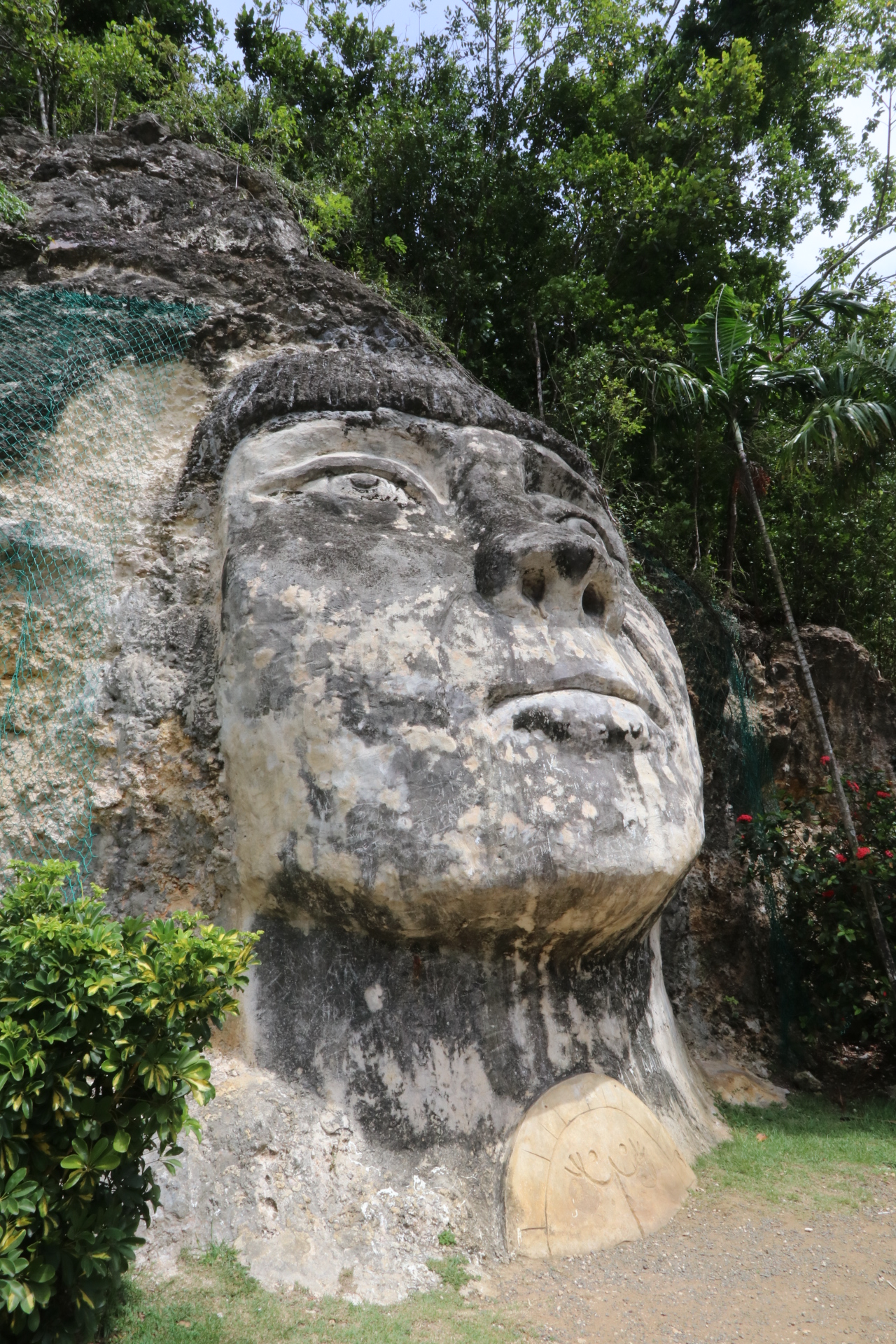
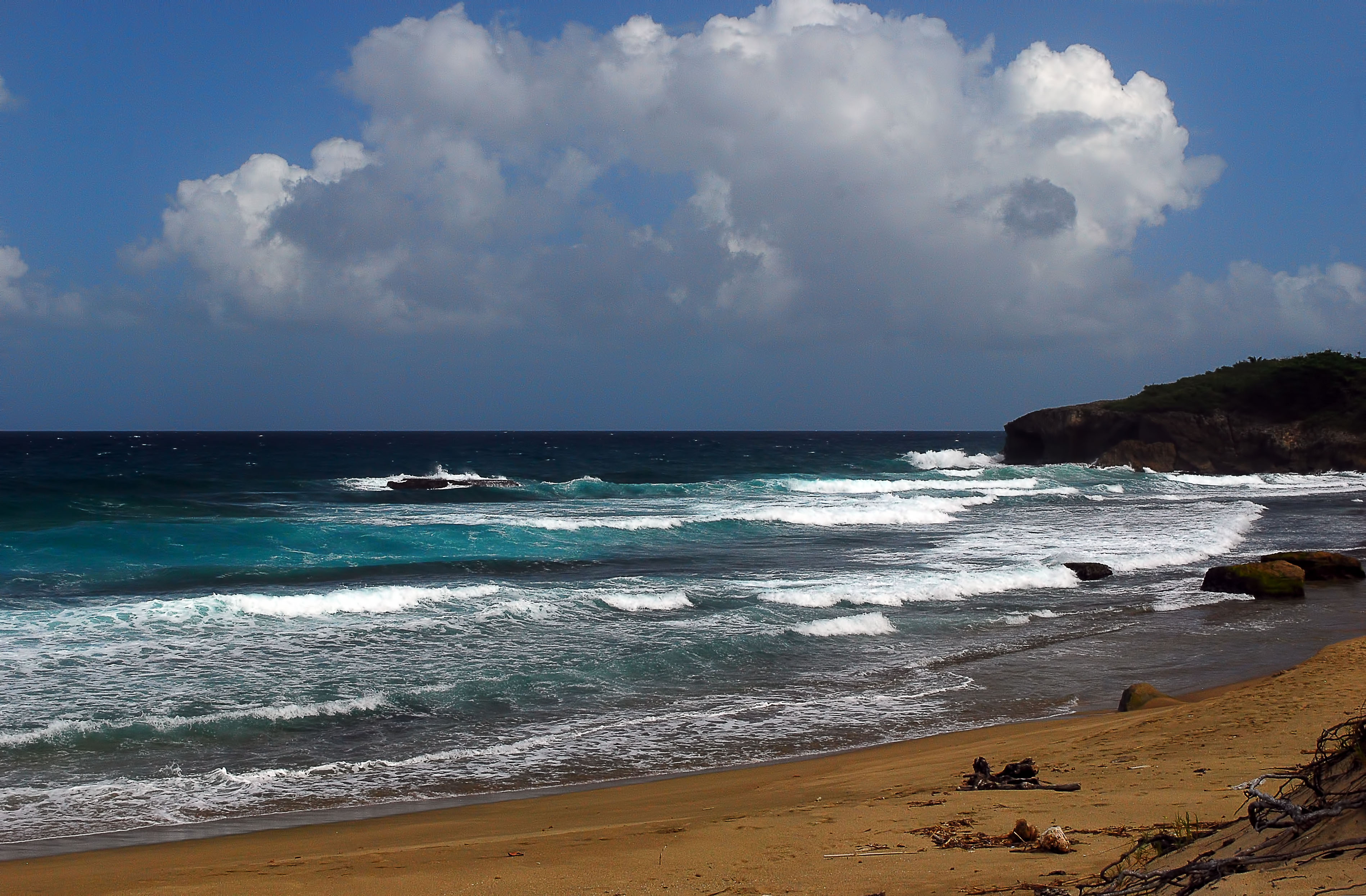
- Isabela; City Hall Isabela Municipal Legislature building Saint Anthony of Padua Catholic Church Ruins of San Antonio de Padua de la Tuna Hermitage Cara del Indio sculpture Jobos; Beach

- Flag Coat of arms
- Nicknames: "El Jardín del Noroeste", "El Pueblo de los Quesitos de Hoja"
- Anthem: "Isabela – Danza "
- Map of Puerto Rico highlighting Isabela Municipality
- Coordinates: 18°30′47″N 67°04′12″W
- Sovereign state: United States
- Commonwealth: Puerto Rico
- Settled: 1720–1725
- Founded: May 21, 1819
- Founder: Manuel Corchado y Juarbe
- Named for: Isabella I of Castile
- Barrios: 14 barrios: Arenales Altos; Arenales Bajos; Bajura; Bejucos; Coto; Galateo Alto; Galateo Bajo; Guayabos; Guerrero; Isabela barrio-pueblo; Jobos; Llanadas; Mora; Planas

Government
  - Mayor: Miguel "Ricky" Mendez (PPD)

Area
  - Total: 91.95 sq mi (238.15 km^{2})
  - Land: 55.36 sq mi (143.39 km^{2})
  - Water: 36.58 sq mi (94.75 km^{2})

Population (2020)
  - Total: 42,943
  - Estimate (2025): 42,938 ▼
  - Rank: 18th in Puerto Rico
  - Density: 775.66/sq mi (299.48/km^{2})
- Demonym: Isabelinos
- Time zone: UTC−4 (AST)
- ZIP Code: 00662
- Area code: 787/939
- Major routes: link = Puerto Rico Highway 212 link = Puerto Rico Highway 113
- Website: https://venaisabela.com/

Isabela (Spanish pronunciation: [isaˈβela]) is a town and municipality of Puerto Rico located in the northwestern region of the main island, north of San Sebastián; west of Quebradillas; and east of Aguadilla and Moca. Named in honor of Queen Isabella I of Castile, it is spread over 13 barrios and Isabela Pueblo, which is the downtown area and administrative center. It is a principal part of the Aguadilla Metropolitan Statistical Area.

== Nicknames ==
The town is known as the Jardín del Noroeste ("Garden of the Northwest"), because of the many wildflowers in its landscape. It is also known as El Pueblo de los Quesitos de Hoja ("Town of Leaf Cheeses") for its production of a typical fresh white cheese wrapped in banana plant leaves, reputed to be the best. It is also known as la Ciudad de los Gallitos or the "City of the Fighting Cocks." Since the 18th century, cock fighting was very common throughout the island, and the town became well known for the quality of its fighting cocks and special breeding and training techniques used by its people.

== History ==
The chief Mabodamaca, one of the most important chieftains of the island of Borinquen (Taíno for Puerto Rico) during the first decades of the 16th century, ruled the region of the 'Guajataca' (Taíno name for the northwestern region of Puerto Rico) where Isabela was founded. Although the actual date of the origins of the first Spanish settlement is not precisely known, a small settlement/hermitage is known to have existed by the end of the 17th century or beginning of the 18th century in a great extension of land into what encompass today the municipalities of Isabela, Camuy and Quebradillas. The settlement was bordered to the east with the shoreline of the Guajataca River and was located on the grounds of an earlier Taíno settlement.

Around 1725, José Antonio de Mendizábal y Azares, Governor of the Island of Puerto Rico granted authorization to base a population on the existing hermitage village. Its given name, San Antonio de La Tuna, derives from the avocation of the Spanish settlers to the saint Anthony of Padua and in honor of a wild cactus growing in the region (Tuna is the Spanish term for cactus). At the end of the 18th century San Antonio de la Tuna had a church, more than sixty houses, and almost 1,200 inhabitants, which was a considerable population for those times.

Prompted by economic and health factors, the decision to relocate the hermitage to a more favorable location was pursued. Around 1818, the village obtained authorization from then Governor Salvador Meléndez Bruna to transfer the population to a new location closer to the coast. Meléndez approved the transfer request and a new town was founded the following year on May 21, 1819. In the same year the construction of the church began, and was finished in 1824. In 1918 the church was damaged during a strong earthquake that affected the western region of the island, it was rebuilt soon after.

Puerto Rico was ceded by Spain in the aftermath of the Spanish–American War under the terms of the Treaty of Paris of 1898 and became a territory of the United States. In 1899, the United States Department of War conducted a census of Puerto Rico finding that the population of Isabela was 14,888.

On September 20, 2017, Hurricane Maria struck Puerto Rico. In Isabela, the hurricane caused destruction of homes and infrastructure. Maria caused structural damage to the nearby Guajataca Reservoir and thousands of people were evacuated from their homes.

== Demographics ==
Historical population
Census	Pop.	Note	%±
1900	14,888		—
1910	16,852		13.2%
1920	19,809		17.5%
1930	23,068		16.5%
1940	25,842		12.0%
1950	29,113		12.7%
1960	28,754		−1.2%
1970	30,430		5.8%
1980	37,435		23.0%
1990	39,147		4.6%
2000	44,444		13.5%
2010	45,631		2.7%
2020	42,943		−5.9%
2025 (est.)	42,938	▼	0.0%
U.S. Decennial Census; 1899 (shown as 1900) 1910–1930; 1930–1950 1960–2000 2010 2020

In the 2010 census, there were 45,631 people in the city. This represents an increase of more than 1,000 from the 2000 census. The population density was 825.1 inhabitants per square mile (318.6/km^{2}). The 2020 census indicated the municipality had 42,943 residents, a decline of over 3,000.

== Geography ==
Isabela is a hybrid of sorts, with the rarity of being a coastline city that has beaches but is also known for its mountains (with peaks of over 1,000 ft [300 m] above sea level), rivers (surface and submarine), lakes, caves (surface and submarine), cliffs, coastal flats and forests (including mangroves). The karstic cliffs found along the coast, together with those of the neighboring municipalities of Aguadilla, Quebradillas and Camuy, have been legally recognized as an Important Bird Area by BirdLife International since 2007 due to their importance as nesting sites for multiple species of seabirds.

Geographically, the municipality of Isabela belongs to the Northern Coastal Plains and the Northern Karst region. Running through the south, the Aymamón Mountains, a prolongation of the Jaicoa Mountain Range that begins in the neighboring municipality of Aguadilla, boasts peaks of over 1,000 feet (300 m) above sea level. The most prominent hills that are part of these mountains are La Bandera (Galateo Alto ward) at 1,207 ft (368 m); La Silla (Arenales Alto ward) at 1,106 ft (337 m); El Sombrero (in Galateo Alto) at 1,083 feet (330 m); Indio (Planas ward) at 1,017 feet (310 m); and Monte Encantado (in Arenales Altos) at 919 feet (280 m) of elevation above sea level. The central part of the territory consists mostly of flatlands, the mountains do not surpass 656 feet (200 m) in height and the coastline flats (Bajuras) are slightly above sea level.

=== Barrios ===
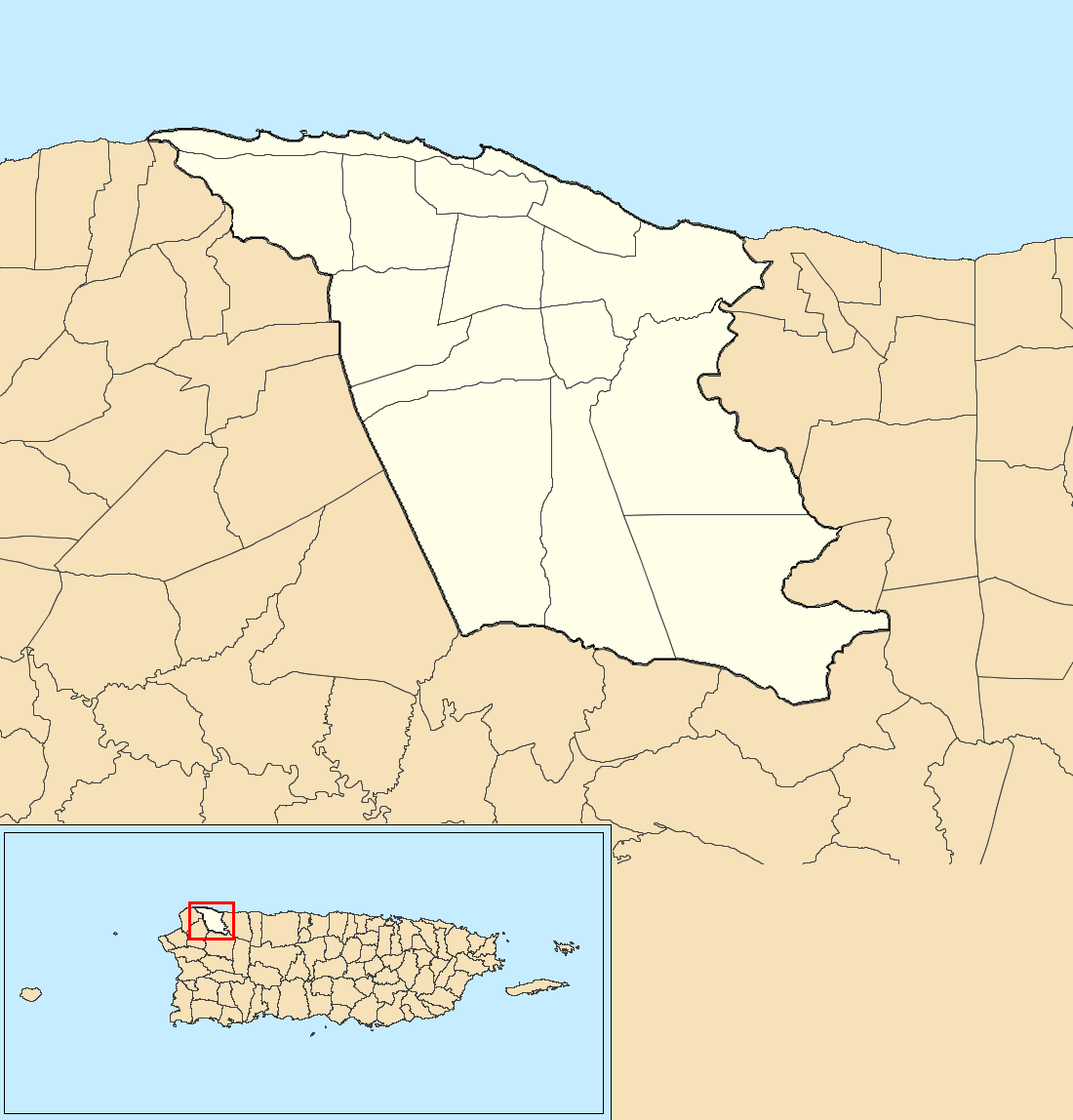
Subdivisions of Isabela

Like all municipalities of Puerto Rico, Isabela is subdivided into barrios. The municipal buildings, central square and large Catholic church are located in a barrio referred to as "el pueblo".

1. Arenales Altos
2. Arenales Bajos
3. Bajura
4. Bejucos
5. Coto
6. Galateo Alto
7. Galateo Bajo
8. Guayabos
9. Guerrero
10. Isabela barrio-pueblo
11. Jobos
12. Llanadas
13. Mora
14. Planas

=== Sectors ===
Barrios (which are, in contemporary times, roughly comparable to minor civil divisions) and subbarrios, are further subdivided into smaller areas called sectores (sectors in English). The types of sectores may vary, from normally sector to urbanización to reparto to barriada to residencial, among others.

=== Special Communities ===
Comunidades Especiales de Puerto Rico (Special Communities of Puerto Rico) are marginalized communities whose citizens are experiencing a certain amount of social exclusion. A map shows these communities occur in nearly every municipality of the commonwealth. Of the 742 places that were on the list in 2014, the following barrios, communities, sectors, or neighborhoods were in Isabela: Cerro del Sombrero in Arenales Alto, Pueblo Nuevo in Arenales Bajos, Barriada Corchado, Comunidad Poncito in Llanadas, Sector Las Parcelas and Sector Pastillo and Sector San Antonio de la Tuna in Coto, Sector Capiro and Sector Corea in Galateo Alto, Sector El Ramal in Guerrero, Parcelas Nuevas and Parcelas Viejas in Mora Guerrero, Comunidad Cristal, Sector Planas, Media Cuerda, Parcelas Jobos, Santa Bárbara, Sector El Cañón, Sector El Verdum, Sector La Mantilla, Sector La Marina, Sector La Mina, Sector La Sierra, Tocones, and Villa Pesquera.

=== Climate ===
Climate data for Isabela Substation, Puerto Rico (1991–2020 normals, extremes 1901–present)
Month	Jan	Feb	Mar	Apr	May	Jun	Jul	Aug	Sep	Oct	Nov	Dec	Year
Record high °F (°C)	95 (35)	95 (35)	98 (37)	96 (36)	97 (36)	99 (37)	98 (37)	99 (37)	99 (37)	97 (36)	96 (36)	95 (35)	99 (37)
Mean maximum °F (°C)	85.9 (29.9)	86.3 (30.2)	87.4 (30.8)	89.1 (31.7)	89.8 (32.1)	90.4 (32.4)	90.0 (32.2)	90.6 (32.6)	91.0 (32.8)	90.8 (32.7)	88.8 (31.6)	86.0 (30.0)	92.9 (33.8)
Mean daily maximum °F (°C)	81.0 (27.2)	81.2 (27.3)	82.5 (28.1)	83.3 (28.5)	84.7 (29.3)	86.0 (30.0)	86.2 (30.1)	86.7 (30.4)	87.1 (30.6)	86.1 (30.1)	83.8 (28.8)	81.8 (27.7)	84.2 (29.0)
Daily mean °F (°C)	73.9 (23.3)	74.0 (23.3)	74.8 (23.8)	76.0 (24.4)	77.7 (25.4)	79.1 (26.2)	79.4 (26.3)	79.9 (26.6)	79.8 (26.6)	79.0 (26.1)	77.2 (25.1)	75.3 (24.1)	77.2 (25.1)
Mean daily minimum °F (°C)	66.7 (19.3)	66.7 (19.3)	67.2 (19.6)	68.6 (20.3)	70.7 (21.5)	72.1 (22.3)	72.5 (22.5)	73.1 (22.8)	72.6 (22.6)	71.9 (22.2)	70.6 (21.4)	68.8 (20.4)	70.1 (21.2)
Mean minimum °F (°C)	61.5 (16.4)	61.4 (16.3)	62.1 (16.7)	64.0 (17.8)	66.3 (19.1)	68.5 (20.3)	67.5 (19.7)	69.6 (20.9)	68.8 (20.4)	67.7 (19.8)	65.8 (18.8)	63.6 (17.6)	59.0 (15.0)
Record low °F (°C)	50 (10)	50 (10)	54 (12)	54 (12)	59 (15)	57 (14)	58 (14)	57 (14)	58 (14)	55 (13)	57 (14)	56 (13)	50 (10)
Average precipitation inches (mm)	3.74 (95)	2.50 (64)	3.86 (98)	4.93 (125)	7.20 (183)	5.55 (141)	5.04 (128)	6.73 (171)	6.73 (171)	6.97 (177)	6.40 (163)	4.41 (112)	64.06 (1,627)
Average precipitation days (≥ 0.01 in)	13.4	9.0	11.2	11.7	14.6	14.4	14.9	16.4	15.7	16.6	16.3	14.5	168.7
Source: NOAA

== Tourism ==
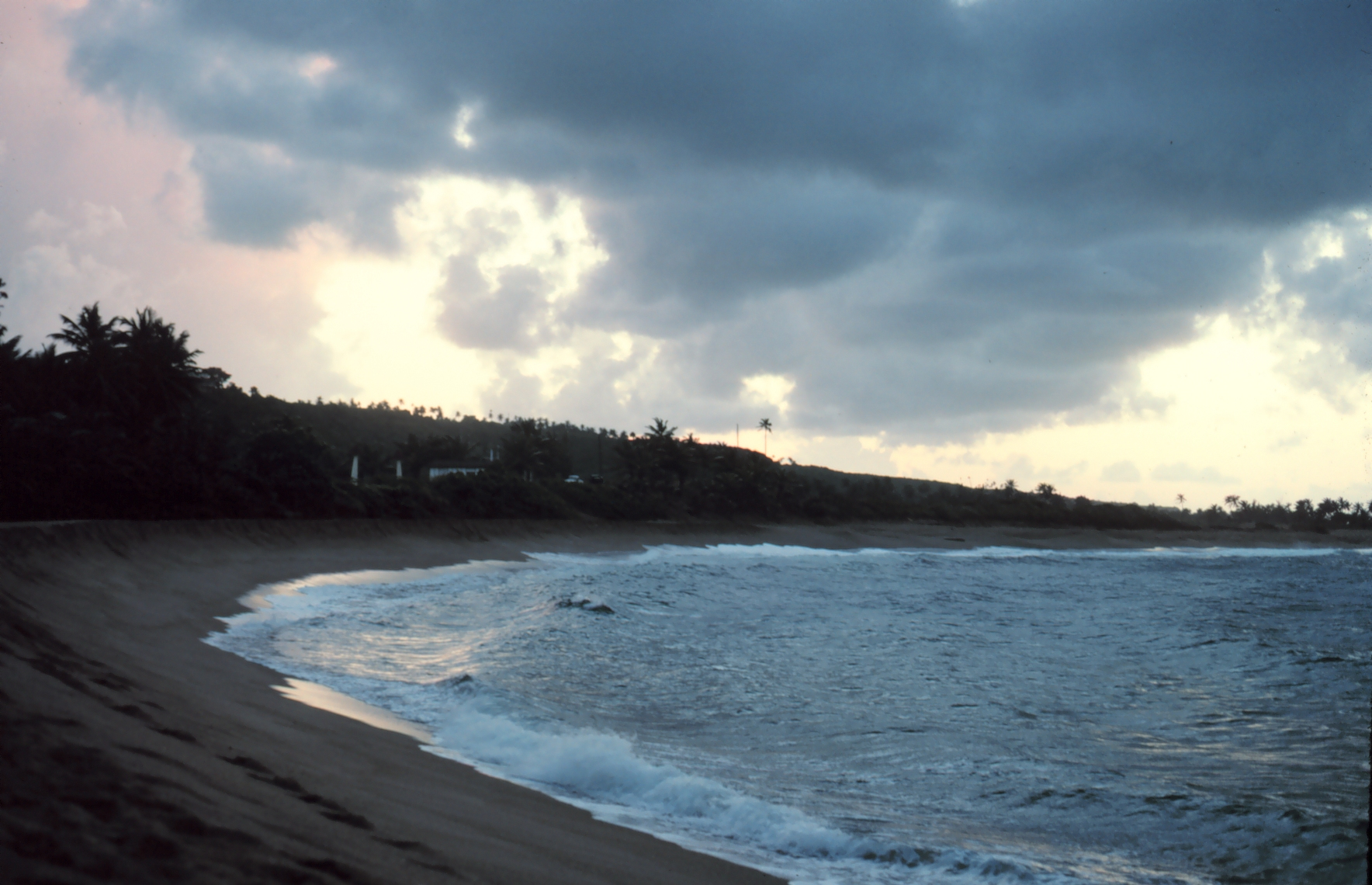
An arcuate beach in Isabela

Centro Empresarial Playero – Villa Pesquera

To stimulate local tourism, the Puerto Rico Tourism Company launched the Voy Turistiendo ("I'm Touring") campaign, with a passport book and website. The Isabela page lists Playa Montones, Tunel de Guajataca, and Mabodamaca, as places of interest.

=== Landmarks and places of interest ===
According to a news article by Primera Hora, there are 12 beaches in Isabela including Jobos. The main attractions of Isabela include:

- El Pozo Brujo (The Bewitched Well)
- Jobos Beach
- Pozo de Jacinto
- Montones Beach
- San Antonio de la Tuna Ruins
- Punta Sardina
- La Poza de Punta Sandina
- La Princesa Beach & Blow Hole
- Villa Pesquera
- Río Guajataca
- Guajataca Tunnel
- La Cara del Indio (The Indian's Face)
- La Posita de Teodoro
- Middles Beach
- La Posita de Montones
- Casa Parroquial
- Parroquia San Antonio de la Tuna
- La Posita de la Princesa
- Shore Island Beach
- Paseo Lineal
- San Antonio de la Tuna Museum
- La Pocita de Isabela (Poza de Teodoro)
- La Cueva de las Golondrinas
- Cueva los Vientos (Bosque Guajataca)
- Photo Museum of Isabela
- Alcaldia de Isabela
- The Pink House (Casa Rosada), (Demolished in 2014 by the Municipality to be transformed into a museum) Lewiz Menz
- Bajura Beach also known as Shacks Beach

== Economy ==
=== Agriculture ===
The early economy of the hermitage had been based mainly on cattle [ranching], its derivative products and hogs products, but trading was limited due to many factors: its inland location and topography. The settlement was posted above a hill overlooking the river (now River Guajataca) which made it difficult to use the river as a trading route, as did the location's propensity to disease and outbreaks.

After the transfer to the present Isabela location the economic realities that resulted from the new land and property opportunities that were readily available, the healthier environment formed due to the wide open plains and prevalent northern winds, and the proximity to the coast and the natural sea port at the bay of Punta Sardina prompted for the diversification of the agricultural products and an increase in trade. The cultivation of sugarcane, coffee, tobacco, cotton, Cassava/yuca, coconut and other fruits was stimulated further. Isabela continued to flourish until recent years due to the island's economic crisis, the closing of important factories and the rising crime rate.

=== Industry ===
Isabela also has a hi-tech plant, a higher education institution, a world-renowned agricultural research center and a major shopping center, Plaza Isabela.

== Culture ==
=== Festivals and events ===
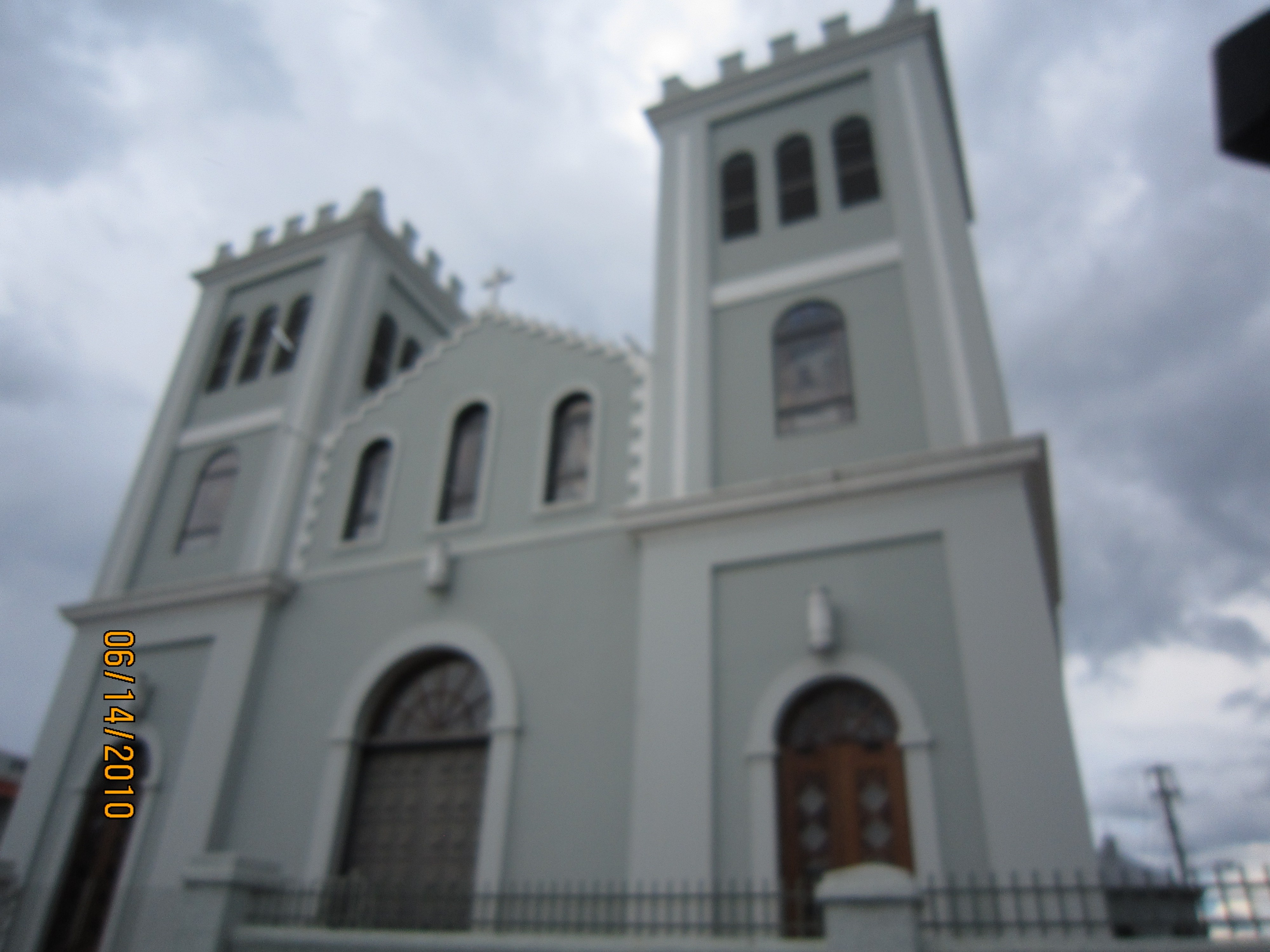
Anthony of Padua Roman Catholic parish church

Isabela celebrates its patron saint festival in June. The Fiestas Patronales de San Antonio de Padua is a religious and cultural celebration that generally features parades, games, artisans, amusement rides, regional food, and live entertainment.

Other festivals and events celebrated in Isabela include:

- Three Kings day – January – organized by La Casa de la Cultura Isabelina Inc (non profit cultural organization) honoring the wiseman (Reyes Magos) tradition represented by the "Reyes Cantores Isabelinos".
- Isabela Cock Fight Festival – February
- Textile Festival – May
- Puerto Rock Steady Music Festival – May
- Weave Festival – May
- Kite Festival – May
- Isabela Muscle Cars Auto Show – August
- Isabela International Tango Festival – August
- Las Noches de la Puertorriqueñidad del colegio San Antonio – November
- Feria de Autos Clasicos y Antiguos del Noroeste Inc. – November
- Isabela Has Flavor – November
- Holy Innocents' Day – December
- Caroling "Escuadrón" (Marina) – December
- Caroling "Siempreviva" (Marina) – January

=== Sports ===
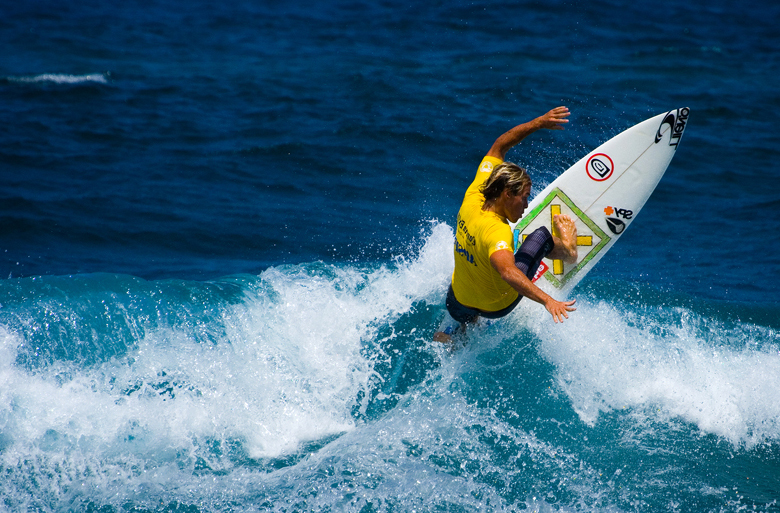
An annual surfing competition is held at Middles Beach

Isabela is also well known for its world-class surfing spots, and hosted two World Cup Surfing Championships, as well as some of the Rip Curl Pro competitions.

Isabela had a basketball team that played at the Jose "Buga" Abreu Coliseum, the Isabela Roosters ("Gallitos de Isabela") Between the mid-1970s and mid-1980s, the Bantams were serious championship contenders. In the late 1970s their star player, Mickey Coll, died in a motorcycle accident. The team's first home court was named after him. The Bantams were Isabela's home team until October 2005 when they moved the franchise to Guaynabo.

The Playeras, a female volleyball team, played in Isabela for 2 seasons until they also moved to Aguadilla becoming Las Divas.

The Isabela Muscle Cars Club, celebrating annual events since 2002, is a popular event in Isabela. On August 28, 2016, the club celebrated their 15th Anniversary at the Coliseum Jose "Buga" Abreu.

The municipality also has its own classic car club, called "Club de Autos Clasicos y Antiguos del Noroeste" (Classic and Old Car Club from Northwest). They also celebrate their own Exhibition of Classic Cars at the coliseum in November.

The local basketball team was called the "Gallitos" ("Little Cocks," in reference to the slim, lightweight body of the fighting variety) due to the town's fame for quality fighting cocks. The name was translated literally into English as "Bantams", a variety of dwarf cocks.

The town has a cockfighting arena, traditionally called a gallera. Fights were customarily held on Sunday mornings, and the bets and stakes were controlled by the government of Puerto Rico. Prizes were paid based on the fighting record of the cocks. A law prohibiting cockfighting in the U.S. and its territories went into effect in early 2019.

Isabela has amateur baseball teams. Also, Isabela is well known for its Fine Step Horses ("Caballos de Paso Fino") and its world class board, wind and kite surfing spots.

== Government ==
Like all municipalities in Puerto Rico, Isabela is administered by a mayor. The current mayor is Miguel "Ricky" Méndez Pérez, from the Popular Democratic Party (PPD). Méndez was elected in the 2020 general election.

The city belongs to the Puerto Rico Senatorial district IV, which is represented by two senators. In 2012, María Teresa González and Gilberto Rodríguez were elected as District Senators.

== Transportation ==
There are 5 bridges in Isabela.

== Symbols ==
The municipio has an official flag and coat of arms.

=== Flag ===
The Isabela flag

Isabela's flag derives its design, colors and symbolism from its coat of arms. It consists of three horizontal stripes of equal width. The top and bottom stripe are yellow and the center one green. The coat of arms may be superposed on the green stripe in the center.

=== Coat of arms ===
Coat of arms of Isabela

The municipal coat of arms, dated 1819, is divided an olive tree in its center, symbolizes the first inhabitants of Isabela and of the island of Puerto Rico, the Igneris Indians. The gold represents the Taíno Indians (they made extensive use of gold), who lived in this area about two hundred years before the discovery of the island. The gold bell represented in the center stripe between two cactus is a symbol of the town of San Antonio de la Tuna. The two cocks represent the bravery of the inhabitants and Isabela's famous fighting cocks. The horse represents the cattle wealth of the region and honors the fine step horses (Paso Fino) for which Isabela is known. The coat of arms is embellished with a mural crown having three towers, the standard emblem at the time for formally established 'pueblos' (townships) under Spanish rule. The revised mural crown with five towers represents a city, but historically, only 11 communities in Puerto Rico were conferred this title when under Spanish rule.

On the occasion of the celebration of 186 years of Isabela it was necessary to adopt an ordinance to establish properly the historical veracity and heraldic elements of the emblazoned shield and official seal of the City of Isabela. The following information was drafted pursuant to Ordinance Number 3, series 2005–2006 and approved by the Municipal Legislature on August 5, 2005:

"The Mural Crown: Current mural crown that has the coat of Isabela has three towers. Due to population increase of over 50,000 inhabitants who had Isabela in this last decade, the HUD office in Washington DC, conferred status as a "city" to Isabela last year. Given this demographic reality and focused on the mural crown that represents the spirit of unity and growth of the inhabitants of our city of Isabela, we understand appropriate that the crown mural consists of "five" distinct towers that symbolize the passage from town to city."

== Gallery ==
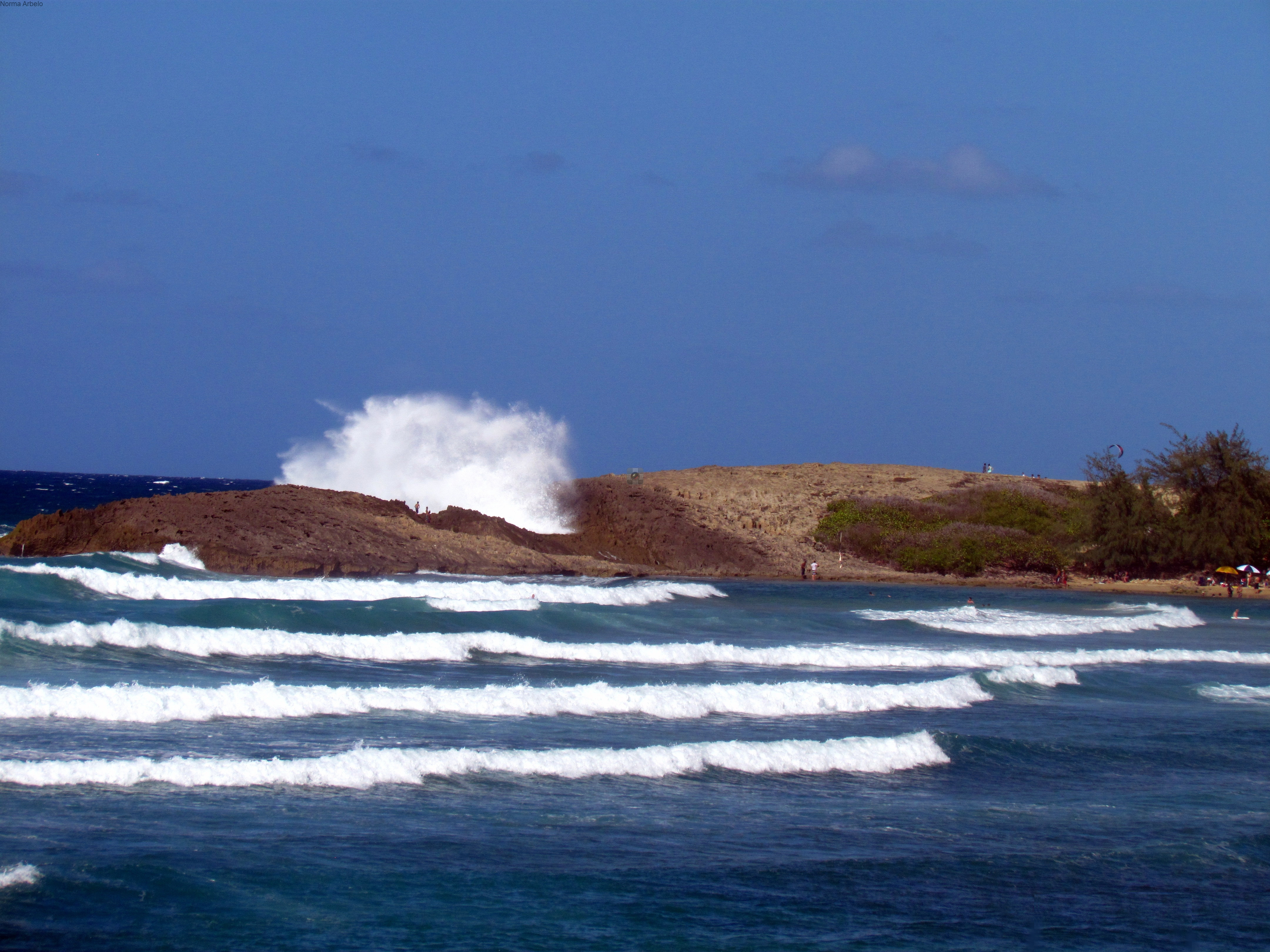
Beach in Isabela

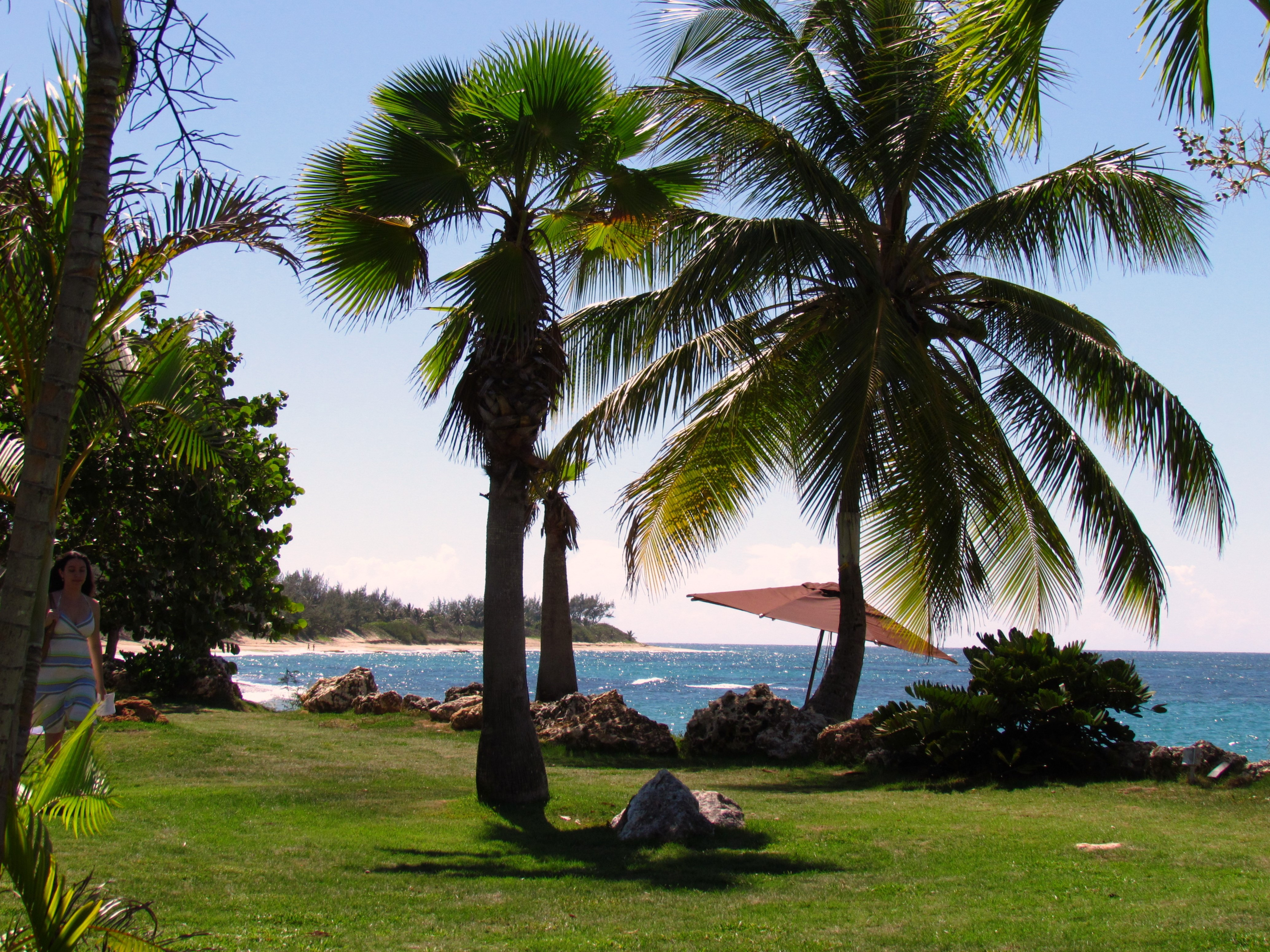
Villa Montaña Beach Resort

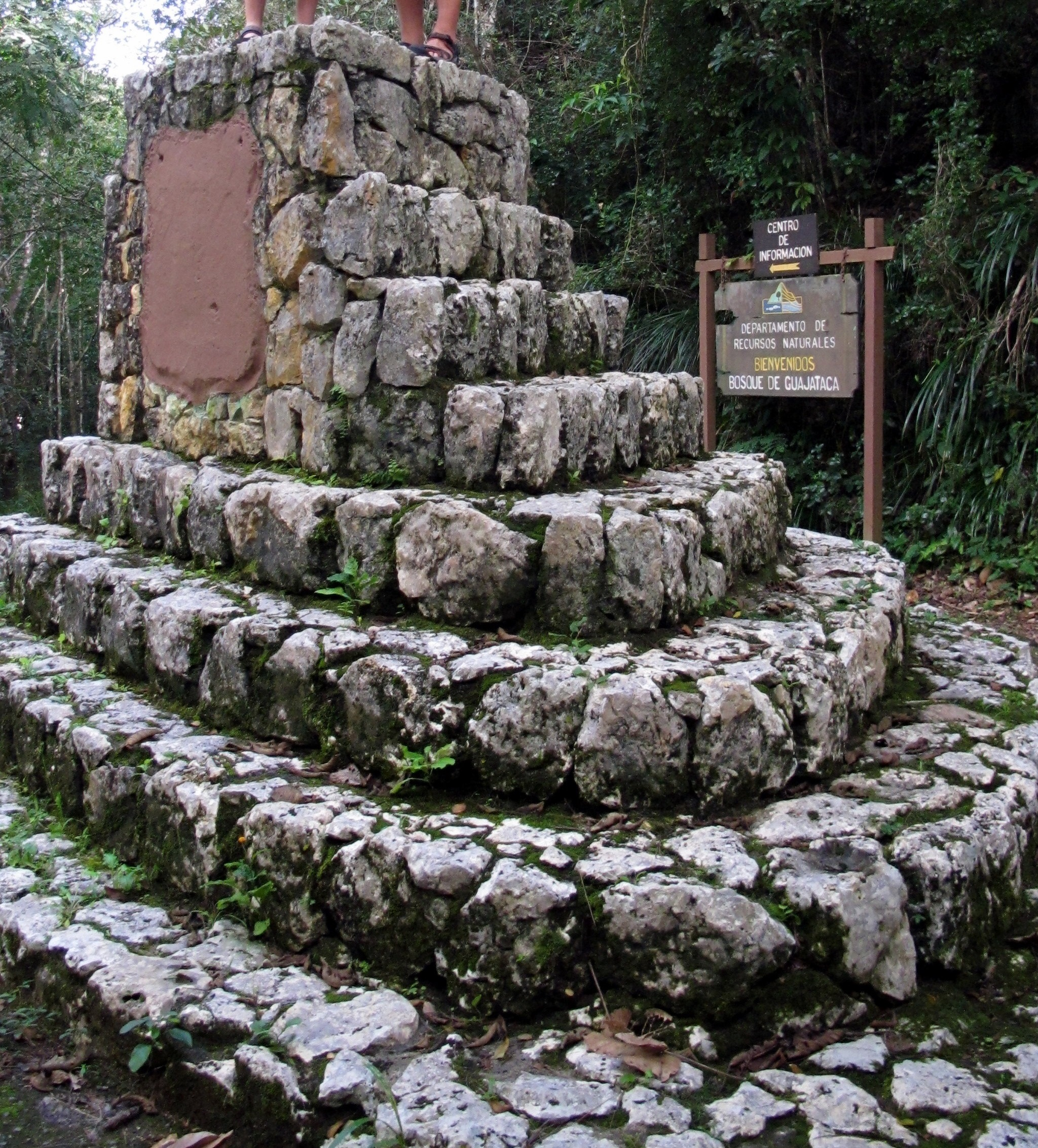
Guajataca State Forest

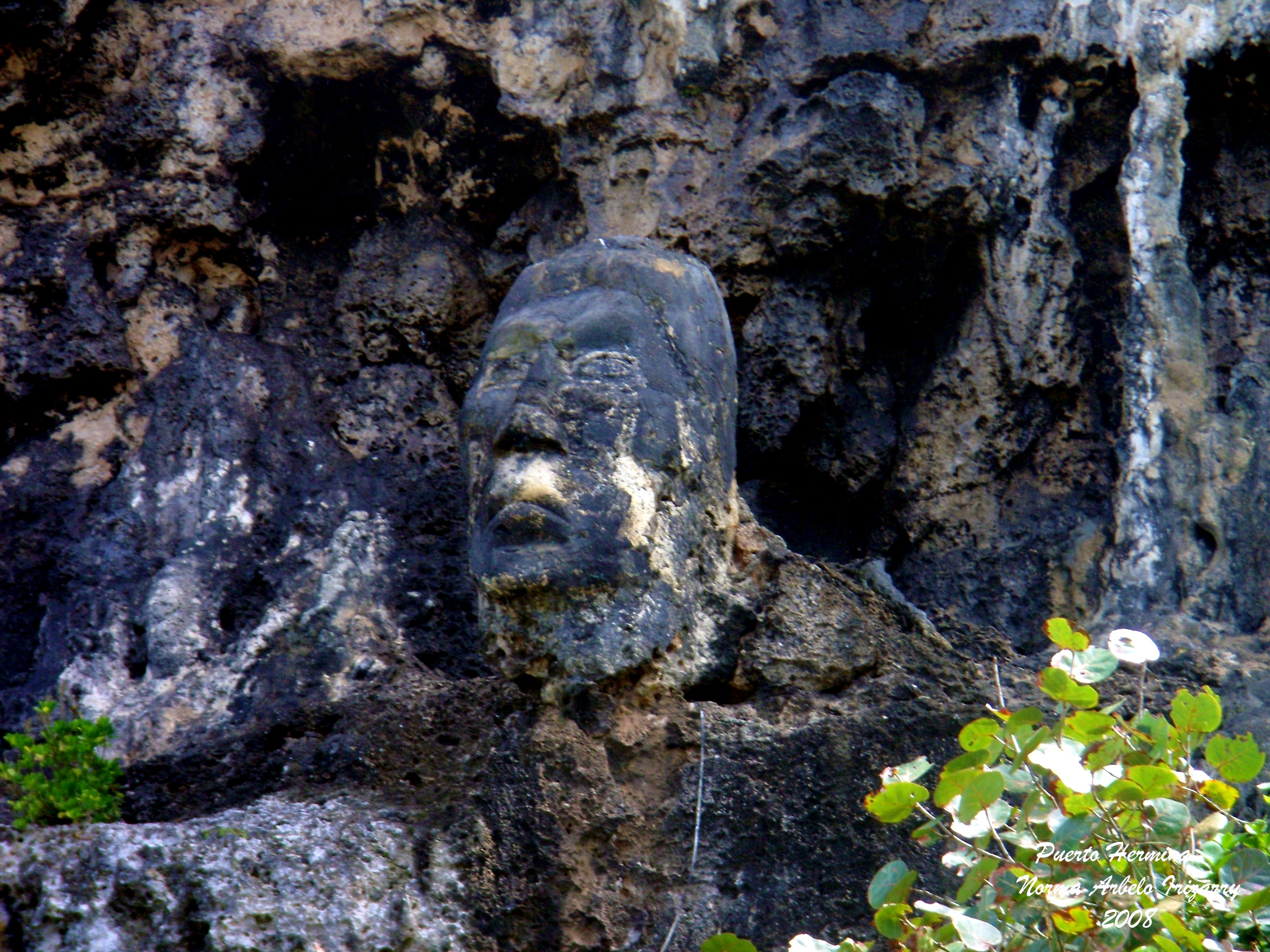
La cara del indio

== Notable people ==
- Félix Mantilla (baseball), former All-Star and World Series champion baseball player for the Milwaukee Braves, New York Mets, Boston Red Sox
- Víctor Manuelle, a world-renowned salsa singer. His parents are from Isabela, and he has featured his hometown in several music videos.
- Manuel Corchado y Juarbe,(September 12, 1840 – November 30, 1884) was a poet, journalist and politician who defended the abolition of slavery and the establishment of a university in Puerto Rico.
- Noel Epinanio Estrada Suárez (June 4, 1918 – December 1, 1979) was a composer. He was the author of "En mi Viejo San Juan", a song "widely known around the world".
- Vicente Geigel Polanco (May 1, 1904 – April 30, 1979) was a lawyer, writer and a former Attorney General of Puerto Rico.

== See also ==
- List of Puerto Ricans
- History of Puerto Rico
- Did you know-Puerto Rico?

== Books ==
- Isabela Economy (18th Century)
- Bibliography Colección de Tesis: Tesis de maestros presentadas en el Departamento de Historia Universidad de Puerto Rico, Recinto de Rio Piedras: Colón, Maria Judith, Historia de Isabela vista a traves de su desarrollo urbano, 1750–1850. (1985), pp. 288
