= Jobos Beach =

Beach in Isabela, Puerto Rico

Coordinates: 18.514215°N 67.075744°W

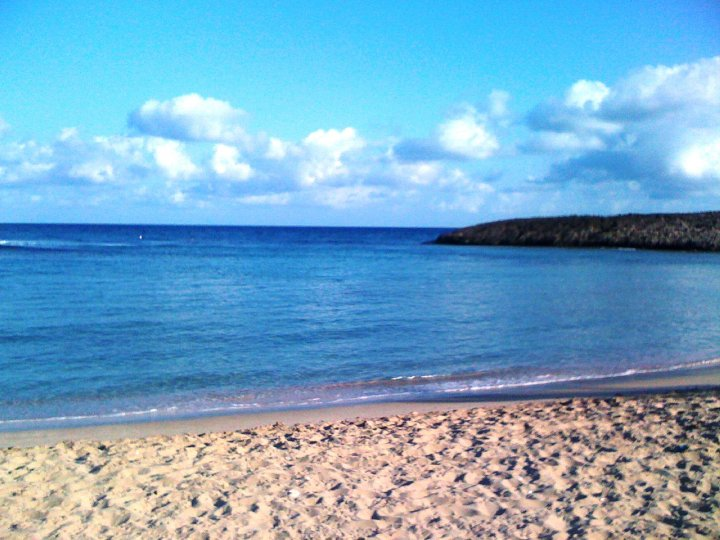
Jobos Beach 01.jpg

Jobos Beach or Playa Jobos is a beach facing the Atlantic Ocean located on the PR-466 street of Isabela in the northwest of Puerto Rico. While popular, the beach is dangerous and signs warning tourists of dangerous currents were installed in early 2021.

Jobos Beach is known as a world-class surf spot and a good place to party. In February 2013, the beach hosted the Rip Curl Pro, a world tour surfing competition. Jobos is also a popular beach for windsurfing. Nearby, also in Isabela, is Pozo de Jacinto, a pit cave steeped in folklore.

The area near Jobos Beach suffered heavy damage from Hurricane Maria on September 20, 2017. The Tito Puente Amphitheatre reopened in mid-December 2017 with a concert by Circo, and other artists with Corona Fest x Nuestra Playas (Corona Fest for our Beaches) to raise funds for the clean-up at Jobos and other beaches in the area.

Jobos Beach in Isabela is considered a dangerous beach.

== Gallery ==
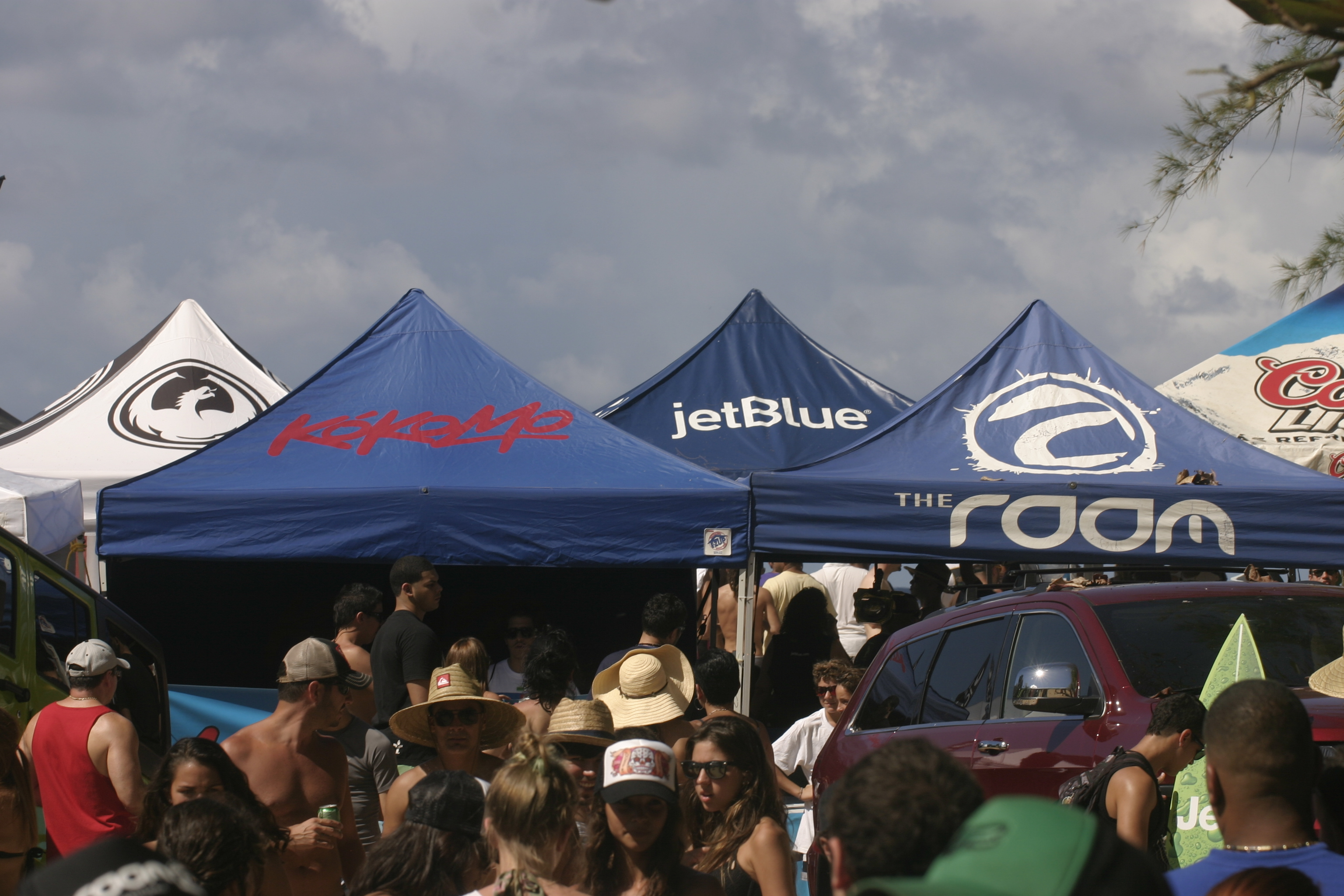
View of Rip Curl pro at Jobos Beach in February 2013

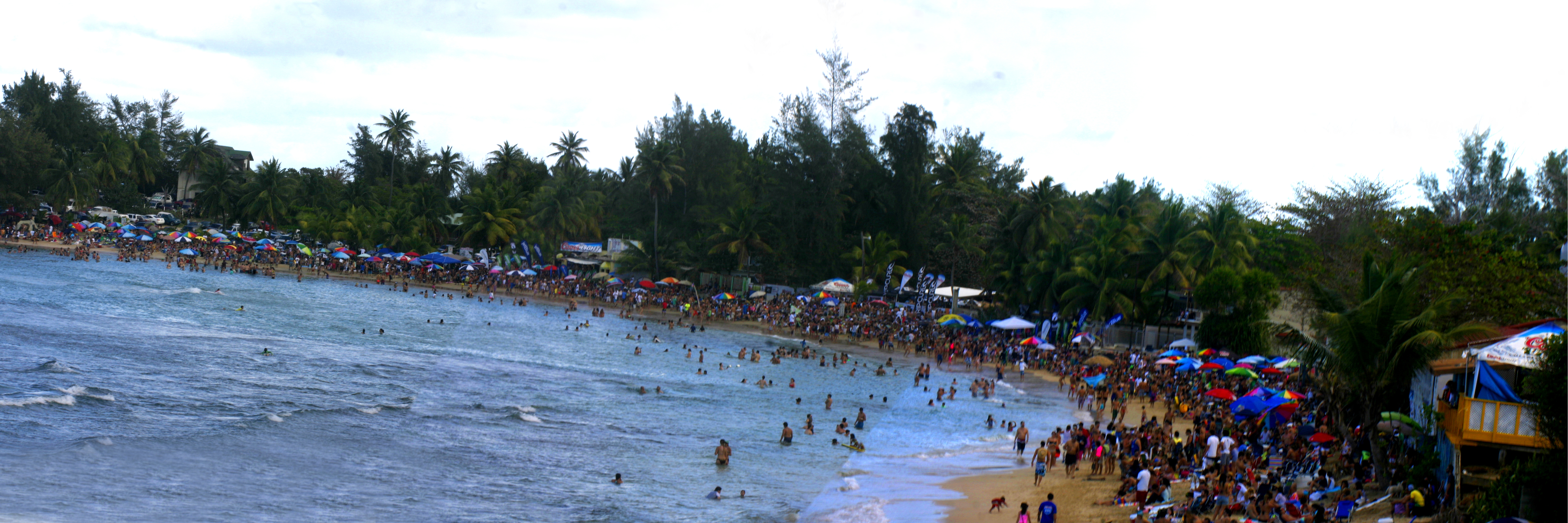
Panoramic View of Rip Curl pro at Jobos Beach in February 2013

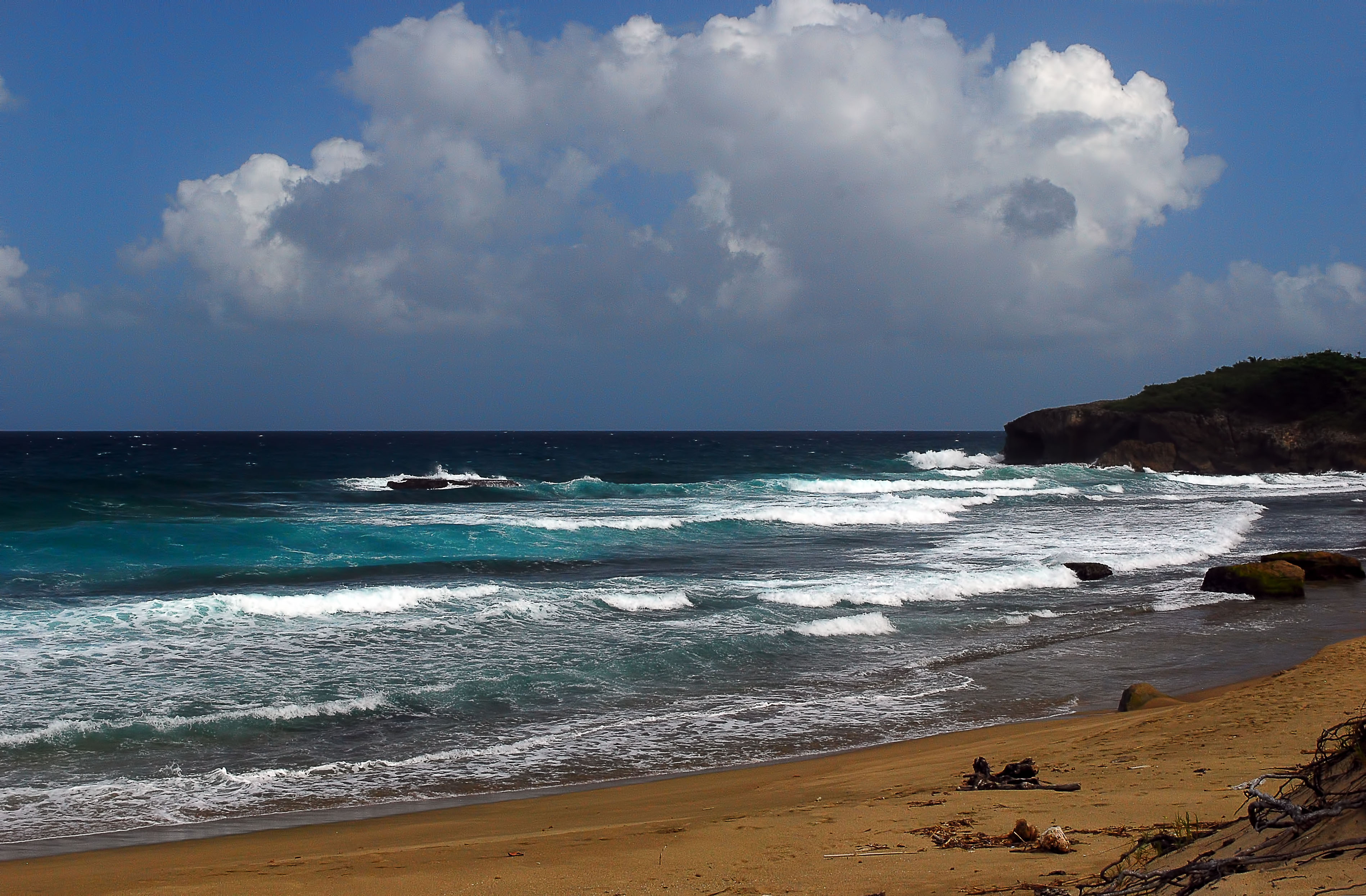
Jobos Beach in 2012
