= Puerto Rico Highway 113 =

Highway in Puerto Rico

Highway 113
- Ruta 113

Route information
- Maintained by Puerto Rico DTPW
- Length: 19.8 km (12.3 mi)
- Existed: 1953–present

Major junctions
- West end: PR-112 / PR-459 in Isabela barrio-pueblo
- PR-4472 in Isabela barrio-pueblo; PR-474 in Guayabos–Mora–Coto; PR-446 in Guayabos–Coto; PR-2 in Coto–Terranova; PR-485 in Quebradillas barrio-pueblo; PR-479 in Quebradillas barrio-pueblo; PR-477 in Quebradillas barrio-pueblo–Terranova–Cacao; PR-478 / PR-480 in Cacao–San Antonio; PR-437 in San Antonio; PR-478 in San Antonio
- East end: PR-119 in Piedra Gorda

Location
- Country: United States
- Territory: Puerto Rico
- Municipalities: Isabela, Quebradillas, Camuy

Highway system
- Roads in Puerto Rico; List
← PR-112	→ PR-114

Puerto Rico Highway 113 (PR-113) is a rural road that travels from Isabela, Puerto Rico to Quebradillas. It begins at downtown Isabela and ends at its intersection with PR-119 near Guajataca Lake.

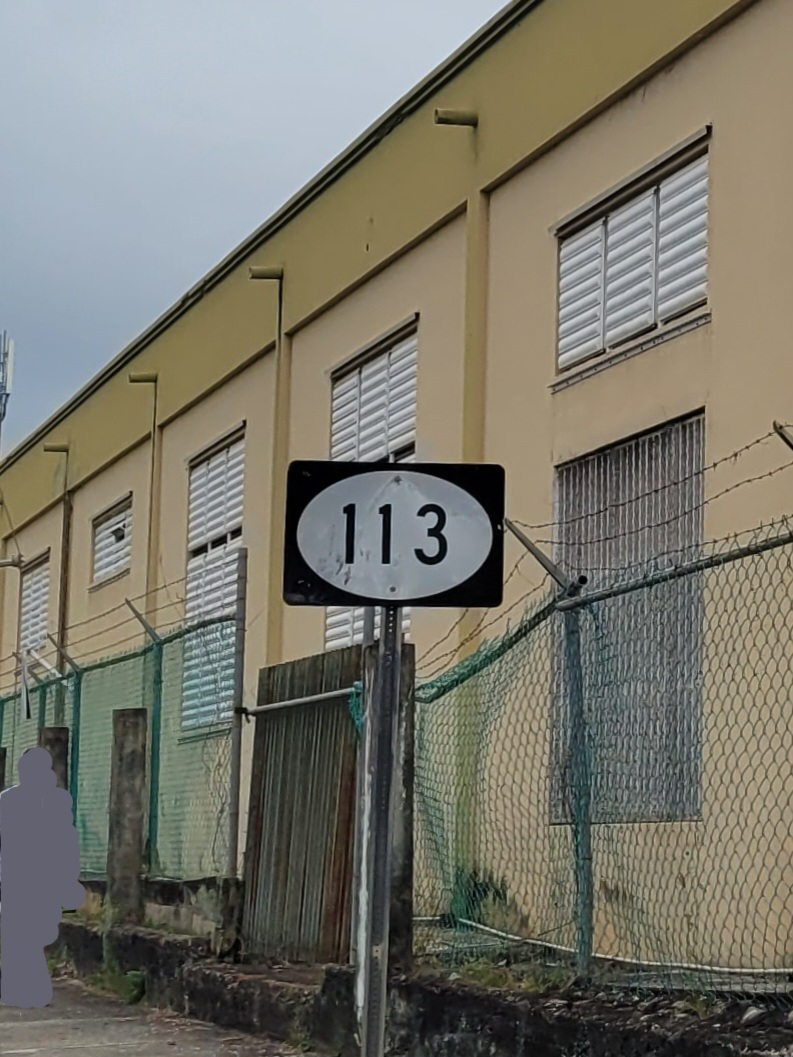
Eastbound sign for PR-113 in Isabela

== Major intersections ==
Municipality	Location	km	mi	Destinations	Notes
Isabela	Isabela barrio-pueblo	0.0	0.0	PR-112 south (Avenida Sargento Agustín Ramos Calero) / PR-459 (Avenida Lamela) – Aguadilla	Western terminus of PR-113; PR-459 access via Calle Juan González
Isabela	Isabela barrio-pueblo	0.1– 0.2	0.062– 0.12	To PR-466 (Calle Emilio González) – Bajura	
Isabela	Isabela barrio-pueblo	0.9	0.56	PR-4472 west (Carretera Víctor Manuelle) – Isabela	
Isabela	Isabela barrio-pueblo	1.1	0.68	PR-473 (Calle Trinitaria) – Isabela	
Isabela	Guayabos–Mora– Coto tripoint	2.2	1.4	PR-474 – Isabela	
Isabela	Guayabos–Coto line	4.3	2.7	PR-446 – Isabela	
Isabela	Coto	7.3 105.1 (Note: Kilometer markers represent the distance along PR-2 rather than PR-113.)	4.5 65.3	PR-2 west – Aguadilla, Mayagüez	Western terminus of PR-2 concurrency; right turn only
Río Guajataca		104.4	64.9	Puente Elvira	
Quebradillas	Terranova	103.6 7.4	64.4 4.6	PR-2 east – Arecibo, San Juan	Eastern terminus of PR-2 concurrency; right turn only
Quebradillas	Quebradillas barrio-pueblo	10.3– 10.4	6.4– 6.5	PR-485 (Calle Félix Lameda) – San José	One-way street; eastbound access via Calle Ramón Saavedra
Quebradillas	Quebradillas barrio-pueblo	10.5	6.5	PR-479 (Calle Socorro) – Quebradillas	One-way street
Quebradillas	Quebradillas barrio-pueblo–Terranova– Cacao tripoint	11.3– 11.4	7.0– 7.1	PR-477 – Cacao	
Quebradillas	Cacao–San Antonio line	13.9	8.6	PR-478 / PR-480 – San Antonio, Cacao	
Quebradillas	San Antonio	16.0	9.9	PR-437 – Charcas	
Quebradillas	San Antonio	17.9	11.1	PR-478 – San Antonio	
Camuy	Piedra Gorda	19.8	12.3	PR-119 – Camuy, San Sebastián	Eastern terminus of PR-113
1.000 mi = 1.609 km; 1.000 km = 0.621 mi: Incomplete access

== See also ==
- 1953 Puerto Rico highway renumbering
