= List of barrios and sectors of Quebradillas, Puerto Rico =

Like all municipalities of Puerto Rico, Quebradillas is subdivided into administrative units called barrios, which are, in contemporary times, roughly comparable to minor civil divisions, (and means wards or boroughs or neighborhoods in English). The barrios and subbarrios, in turn, are further subdivided into smaller local populated place areas/units called sectores (sectors in English). The types of sectores may vary, from normally sector to urbanización to reparto to barriada to residencial, among others. Some sectors appear in two barrios.

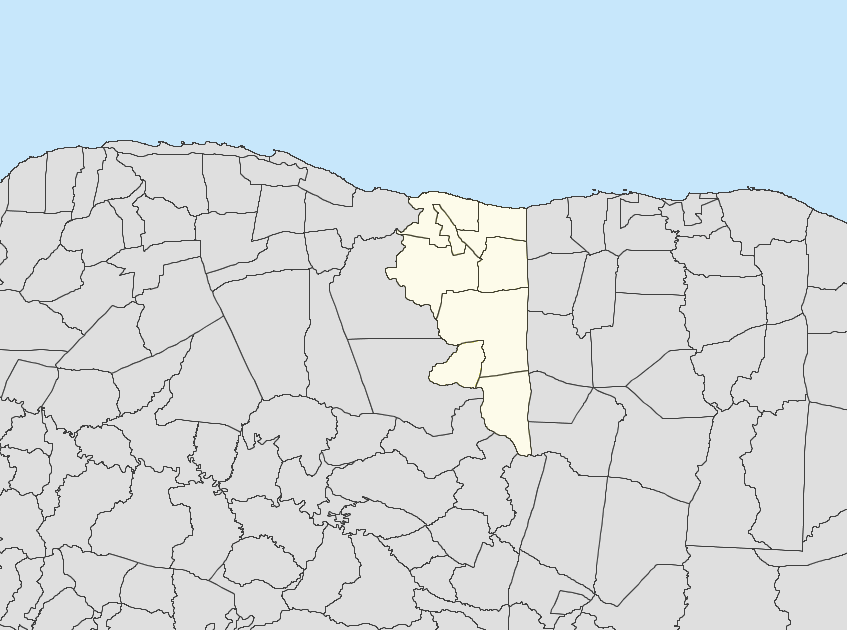
Quebradillas map with barrio subdivisions

== List of sectors by barrio ==
=== Cacao ===
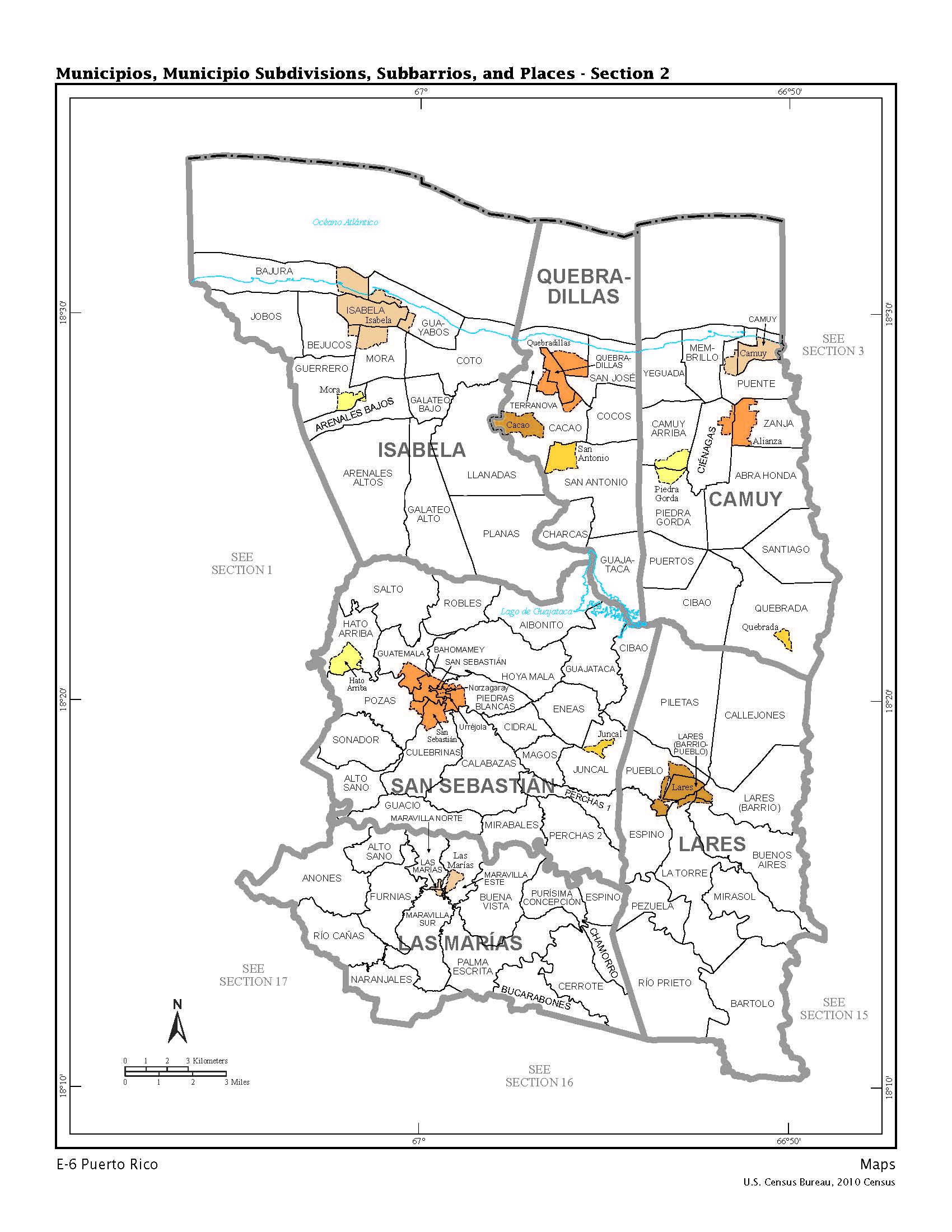
US 2010 census map of Municipios, Municipio Subdivisions, Subbarrios, and Places of Isabela, Quebradillas, Camuy, Lares, Las Marías and San Sebastián

- Calle Las Rosas
- Carretera 113
- Carretera 477
- Carretera 480
- Estancias del Pirata
- Estancias San Javier
- Parcelas Chivas
- Reparto La Romana
- Sector Cubujón
- Sector Juan Morell
- Sector La Romana
- Sector Lasalle
- Sector Las Chivas
- Sector Quin Ávila
- Sector Talas
- Urbanización Haciendas de Guajataca
- Urbanización Santa Marina

=== Charcas ===
- Carretera 437
- Sector El Llano
- Sector Los Muñices

=== Cocos ===
- Calle La Ceiba
- Calle Lucía Rivera
- Calle Socorro
- Calle Vicentita Delís
- Carretera 482
- Carretera 483
- Carretera 485
- Carretera Ramal 484
- Extensión Lamela
- Parcelas Los Cocos
- Reparto Amador
- Reparto Bordel
- Residencial Francisco Vigo Salas
- Residencial Villa Julia
- Sector Arturo Jiménez
- Sector Cuatro Calles
- Sector Dámaso Soto
- Sector El Verde
- Sector Felipe Cruz
- Sector Hoyo Brujo (Fito Valle)
- Sector Julián Hernández
- Sector La Ceiba
- Sector La Cuesta
- Sector Lajas
- Sector Las Piedras
- Sector Los González
- Sector Los Lugo
- Sector Los Paganes
- Sector Pallens
- Urbanización Ávila
- Urbanización El Retiro
- Urbanización Hacienda Guadalupe
- Urbanización Kennedy
- Urbanización Las Ceibas (from km 99.1 of Carretera 2)
- Urbanización Villa Norma

=== Guajataca ===
- Carretera 119
- Carretera 453
- Sector Charcas
- Sector Cico Hernández
- Sector Julio Nieves
- Sector Las Palmas
- Sector Los Jaca
- Sector Los Méndez
- Sector Los Vargas
- Sector Los Vélez
- Sector Man Rodríguez
- Sector Margarita
- Sector Medina
- Sector Potracio Nieves
- Sector Pozada de Amor
- Sector Riego
- Sector Román

=== Quebradillas barrio-pueblo ===
- Residencial Jardines del Carmen
- Urbanización La Ceiba

=== San Antonio ===
- Calle Guelo Sonera
- Calle Pedro López
- Carretera Nueva
- Carretera 113
- Carretera 478
- Carretera 480
- Carretera 482
- Carretera 483
- Parcelas San Antonio
- Sector Arizona
- Sector Barca de Oro (Negocio)
- Sector Casa de Piedra
- Sector El Fósforo
- Sector Guzmán
- Sector La Hacienda
- Sector La Rabúa
- Sector Los Romanes
- Sector Montadero
- Sector Palmarito
- Sector Piquiñas

=== San José ===
- Calle San Miguel
- Camimo de Aniceto Román
- Carretera 485
- Condominio Paraíso del Atlántico
- Residencial Parque del Retiro
- Sector Jayuya
- Sector Yeguada (Carretera 435)
- Urbanización Brisa Tropical

=== Terranova ===
- Calle Coliseo
- Calle del Parque
- Calle Las Flores
- Camino Amador
- Carretera 113
- Carretera 477
- Parcelas Terranova
- Reparto Muñoz
- Residencial Guarionex
- Sector Estación
- Sector Juan González
- Sector Las Cuevitas
- Sector Los Barros
- Sector Los Prietos
- Sector Quebrada Mala
- Sector Rábano
- Sector Villa Durán
- Sector Villa Varguitas
- Urbanización San Rafael

== See also ==
- List of communities in Puerto Rico
