= Cacao, Quebradillas, Puerto Rico =

Barrio of Puerto Rico

Cacao
- Barrio
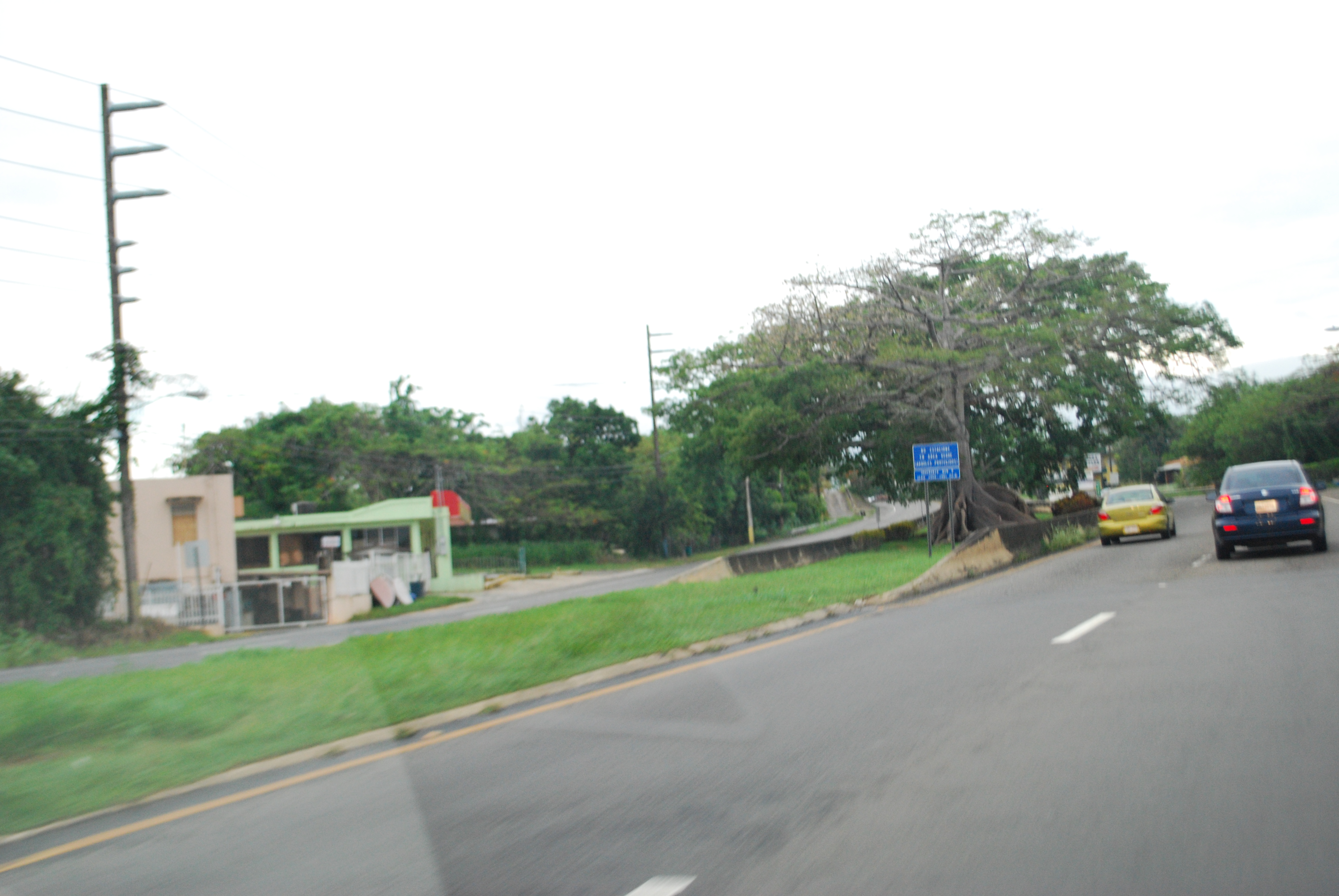
- Puerto Rico Highway 2 between Cacao and San José

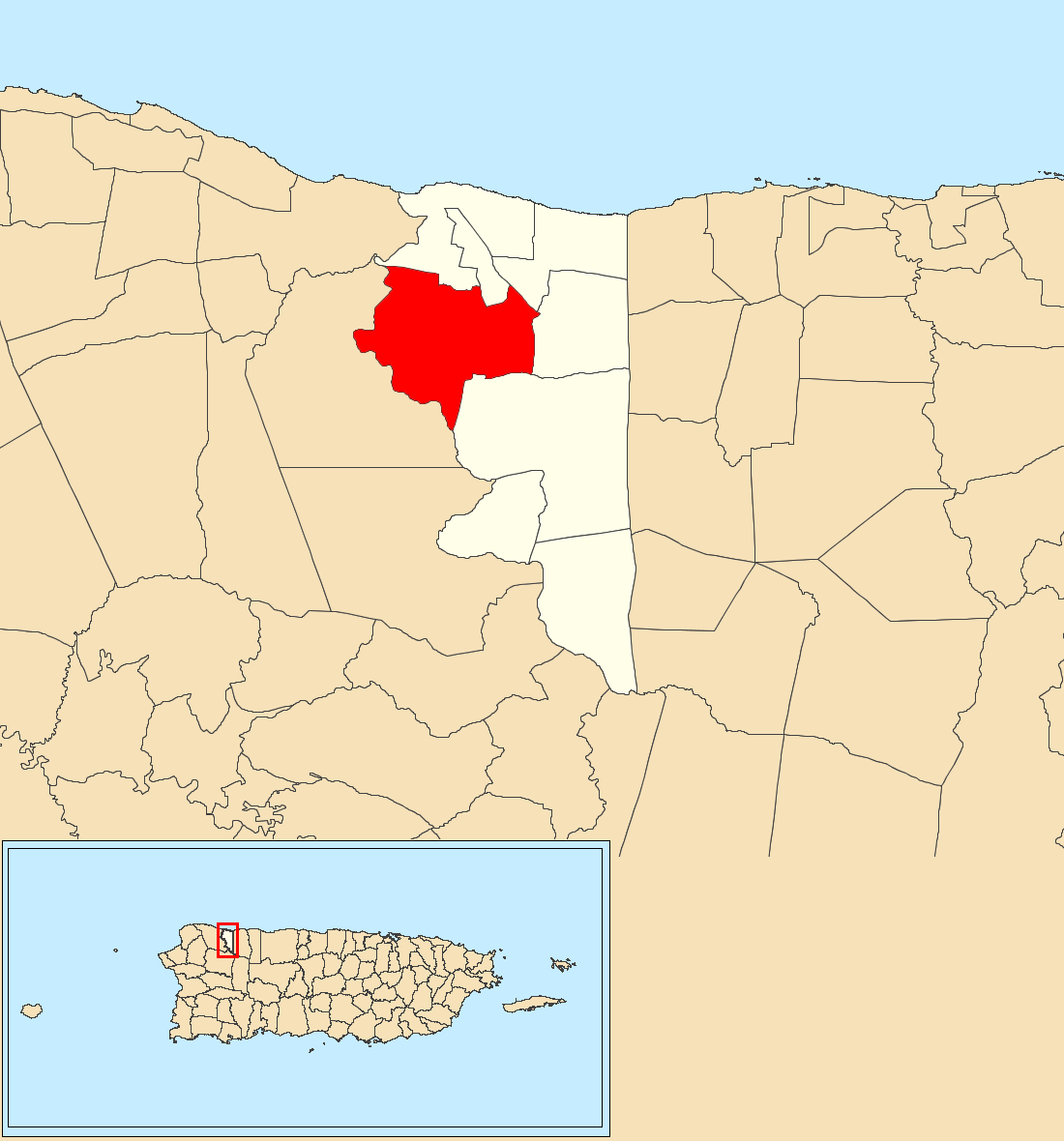
- Location of Cacao within the municipality of Quebradillas shown in red

- Location of Puerto Rico
- Coordinates: 18°27′17″N 66°56′33″W
- Commonwealth: Puerto Rico
- Municipality: Quebradillas

Area
  - Total: 4.44 sq mi (11.5 km^{2})
  - Land: 4.39 sq mi (11.4 km^{2})
  - Water: 0.05 sq mi (0.13 km^{2})
- Elevation: 469 ft (143 m)

Population (2010)
  - Total: 4,663
  - Density: 1,062.2/sq mi (410.1/km^{2})
- Source: 2010 Census
- Time zone: UTC−4 (AST)
- ZIP Code: 00678
- Area code: 787/939

Cacao is a barrio in the municipality of Quebradillas, Puerto Rico. Its population in 2010 was 4,663. One of the communities within this barrio is named Cacao Community and in 2010 had a population of 1,001.

Historical population
| Census | Pop. | Note | %± |
|---|---|---|---|
| 1900 | 1,066 | | — |
| 1910 | 1,223 | | 14.7% |
| 1920 | 1,392 | | 13.8% |
| 1930 | 1,473 | | 5.8% |
| 1940 | 1,825 | | 23.9% |
| 1950 | 1,961 | | 7.5% |
| 1960 | 1,944 | | −0.9% |
| 1970 | 0 | | −100.0% |
| 1980 | 3,953 | | — |
| 1990 | 4,228 | | 7.0% |
| 2000 | 5,819 | | 37.6% |
| 2010 | 4,663 | | −19.9% |
U.S. Decennial Census; 1899 (shown as 1900) 1910-1930; 1930-1950 1980-2000 2010

== History ==
Cacao was in Spain's gazetteers until Puerto Rico was ceded by Spain in the aftermath of the Spanish–American War under the terms of the Treaty of Paris of 1898 and became an unincorporated territory of the United States. In 1899, the United States Department of War conducted a census of Puerto Rico finding that the population of Cacao barrio was 1,066.

== Sectors ==
Barrios (which are, in contemporary times, roughly comparable to minor civil divisions) in turn are further subdivided into smaller local populated place areas/units called sectores (sectors in English). The types of sectores may vary, from normally sector to urbanización to reparto to barriada to residencial, among others.

The following sectors are in Cacao barrio:

Calle Las Rosas, Carretera 113, Carretera 477, Carretera 480, Estancias del Pirata, Estancias San Javier, Parcelas Chivas, Reparto La Romana, Sector Cubujón, Sector Juan Morell, Sector La Romana, Sector Lasalle, Sector Las Chivas, Sector Quin Ávila, Sector Talas, Urbanización Haciendas de Guajataca, and Urbanización Santa Marina.

== See also ==
- List of communities in Puerto Rico
- List of barrios and sectors of Quebradillas, Puerto Rico
