= Charcas =

Charcas may refer to:

- Charcas Province, a province in Potosí Department, Bolivia
- Real Audiencia of Charcas, one of six political units of the Viceroyalty of Peru
- Charcas, a historical name of Sucre, capital of Bolivia
  - University of Saint Francis Xavier, also known as the University of Charcas
- Charca people, an Indian tribe that inhabited the Chuquisaca Department prior to the arrival of the Spaniards
- Charcas, San Luis Potosí, a town and municipality in the state of San Luis Potosí, Mexico
- Las Charcas, Azua, a town in the Azua Province of the Dominican Republic
- Charcas, Quebradillas, Puerto Rico, a barrio in Quebradillas, in Puerto Rico (U.S.)
