= San Antonio, Quebradillas, Puerto Rico =

Barrio of Puerto Rico

San Antonio
- Barrio
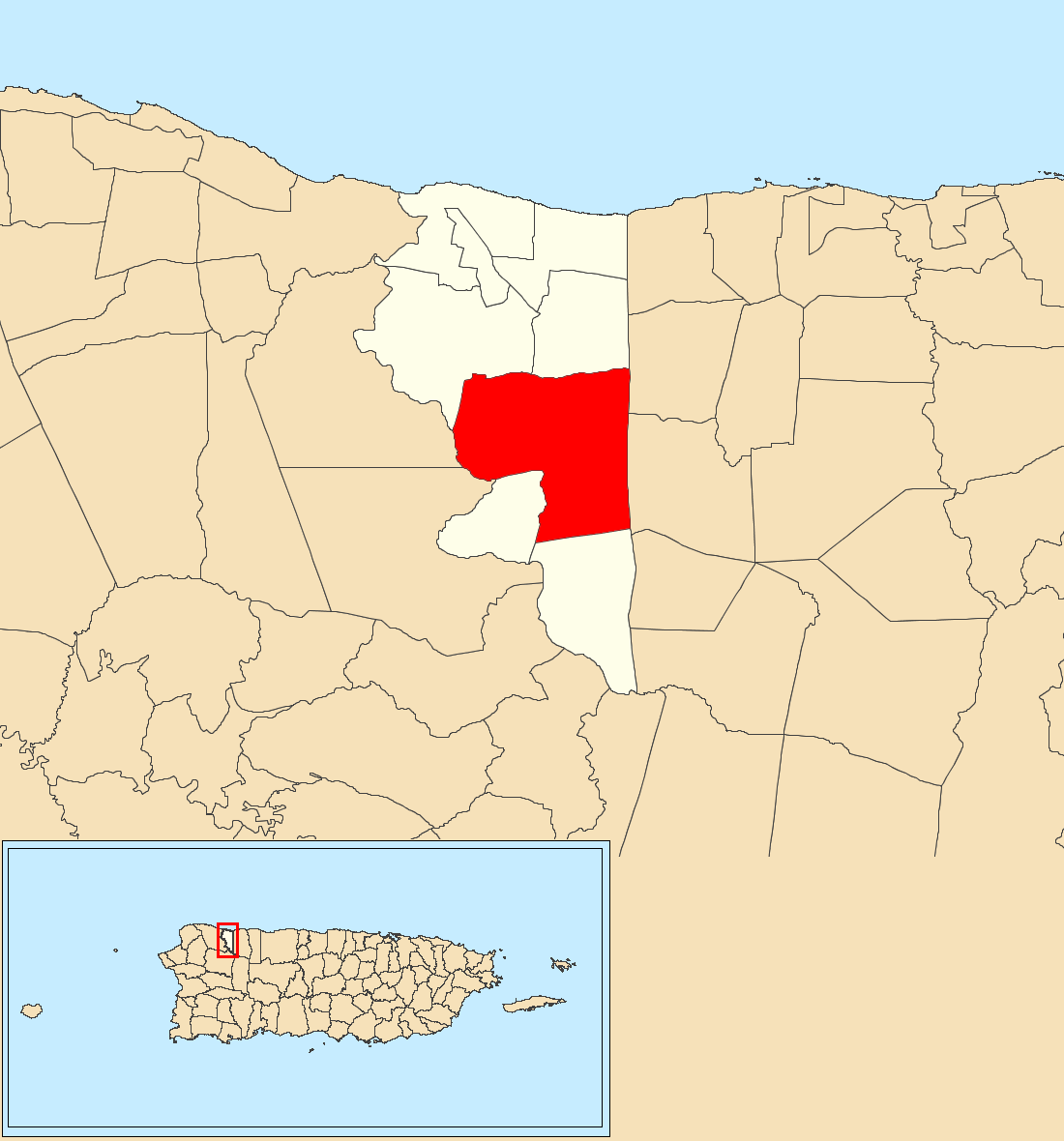
- Location of San Antonio within the municipality of Quebradillas shown in red

- Location of Puerto Rico
- Coordinates: 18°25′40″N 66°55′08″W
- Commonwealth: Puerto Rico
- Municipality: Quebradillas

Area
  - Total: 6.08 sq mi (15.7 km^{2})
  - Land: 6.08 sq mi (15.7 km^{2})
  - Water: 0 sq mi (0 km^{2})
- Elevation: 761 ft (232 m)

Population (2010)
  - Total: 5,164
  - Density: 849.3/sq mi (327.9/km^{2})
- Source: 2010 Census
- Time zone: UTC−4 (AST)
- ZIP Code: 00678
- Area code: 787/939

San Antonio is a barrio in the municipality of Quebradillas, Puerto Rico. Its population in 2010 was 5,164.

Historical population
Census	Pop.	Note	%±
1900	1,760		—
1910	1,886		7.2%
1920	2,196		16.4%
1930	2,242		2.1%
1940	2,311		3.1%
1950	3,119		35.0%
1960	3,160		1.3%
1970	3,451		9.2%
1980	4,350		26.1%
1990	4,424		1.7%
2000	5,262		18.9%
2010	5,164		−1.9%
U.S. Decennial Census; 1899 (shown as 1900) 1910-1930; 1930-1950 1980-2000 2010

== History ==
San Antonio was in Spain's gazetteers until Puerto Rico was ceded by Spain in the aftermath of the Spanish–American War under the terms of the Treaty of Paris of 1898 and became an unincorporated territory of the United States. In 1899, the United States Department of War conducted a census of Puerto Rico finding that the population of San Antonio barrio was 1,760.

== Sectors ==
Barrios (which are, in contemporary times, roughly comparable to minor civil divisions) in turn are further subdivided into smaller local populated place areas/units called sectores (sectors in English). The types of sectores may vary, from normally sector to urbanización to reparto to barriada to residencial, among others.

The following sectors are in San Antonio barrio:

Calle Guelo Sonera, Calle Pedro López, Carretera Nueva, Carretera 113, Carretera 478, Carretera 480, Carretera 482, Carretera 483, Parcelas San Antonio (Pequeñas y Grandes), Sector Arizona, Sector Barca de Oro (Negocio), Sector Casa de Piedra, Sector El Fósforo, Sector Guzmán, Sector La Hacienda, Sector La Rabúa, Sector Los Romanes, Sector Montadero, Sector Palmarito, and Sector Piquiñas.

== See also ==
- List of communities in Puerto Rico
- List of barrios and sectors of Quebradillas, Puerto Rico
