= Heriberto Vélez =

Puerto Rican politician (born 1964)

Heriberto Vélez Vélez

Mayor of Quebradillas
- Assuming office January 14, 2005
- Succeeding: Luis Pérez Reillo

Personal details
- Born: January 25, 1964 (age 62) Quebradillas, Puerto Rico
- Party: Popular Democratic Party (PPD)
- Spouse: Edith Zenaida Irrizary
- Education: Pontifical Catholic University of Puerto Rico (B.Ed.)
- Salary: $6,500 monthly

Heriberto Vélez Vélez (born January 25, 1964) is a Puerto Rican politician and the current mayor of Quebradillas. Vélez is affiliated with the Popular Democratic Party (PPD) and has served as mayor since 2005.

== Personal life ==
According to a report by El Nuevo Día in 2016 Heriberto's main residence and a separate plot of land are located in Quebradillas and are valued at $225,000. The mayor also owns another property valued at $250,000 in Cabo Rojo. Three vehicles were under the mayor's name including a Pathfinder, Ford Mustang and Dodge Ram.

== Education ==
Graduated from Juan Alejo Arizmendi High School in Quebradillas. Has a bachelor's degree in Education, with a concentration in mathematics from the Pontifical Catholic University of Puerto Rico.

== Tenure as Mayor ==
Heriberto has been mayor of Quebradillas since 2006. He was reflected during the 2016 election with 59% of the vote and in 2020 he won his fifth term with 62% of the vote.

During his tenure as mayor Heriberto has inaugurated six electronic libraries, various community centers, an aquatic park named "Los Chorritos Piratas", and a mini golf course. In 2021 the mayor inaugurated a daycare center for children ages 3–5 and a fitness center. In 2013 the mayor purchased a mansion with an initial investment of $2 million to turn the property into a hotel the next year. According to the state agency the Center for Municipal Revenue Collection (CRIM, for its initials in Spanish) the municipality still owns the property but the mansion has not been converted. In January 2021 the municipal government purchased heavy machinery to assist with the removal of vegetation.

=== Audits ===
Since 2006, the Puerto Rico Comptroller's Office has made several investigations into Quebradillas' fiscal health and financial mismanagement under Vélez Vélez's mayoralty. Between 2006 and 2008, among other findings, the audit reports found that building and upkeep services were hired without obtaining the necessary construction permits. Services were also "provided without the granting of written contracts, inspections not being carried out and contracting of works and improvements without obtaining the corresponding insurance policies and securities." Deficiencies in contracting engineering services were also found, as well as the purchase of heavy equipment from outside of Puerto Rico without the necessary guarantees. Additionally, there were services paid from federal funds with irregularities in the market rate quotes, as well as "overdrafts in special funds".

Another report, compromising the period between the beginning of 2015 till mid 2018, that the municipality invested $180,479 in a library and community center construction project without the necessary permits, which were acquired 25 days after.

In June 2020 a report from the special independent prosecutor panel (PFEI, for its initials in Spanish) alleged the mayor had used kitchen equipment paid with Head Start funds, were used for a personal restaurant. In 2021 the special independent prosecutor panel archived a case against the mayor related to allegations of using public funds for paint destined for his own home.
