= Guajataca, Quebradillas, Puerto Rico =

Barrio of Puerto Rico

Guajataca
- Barrio
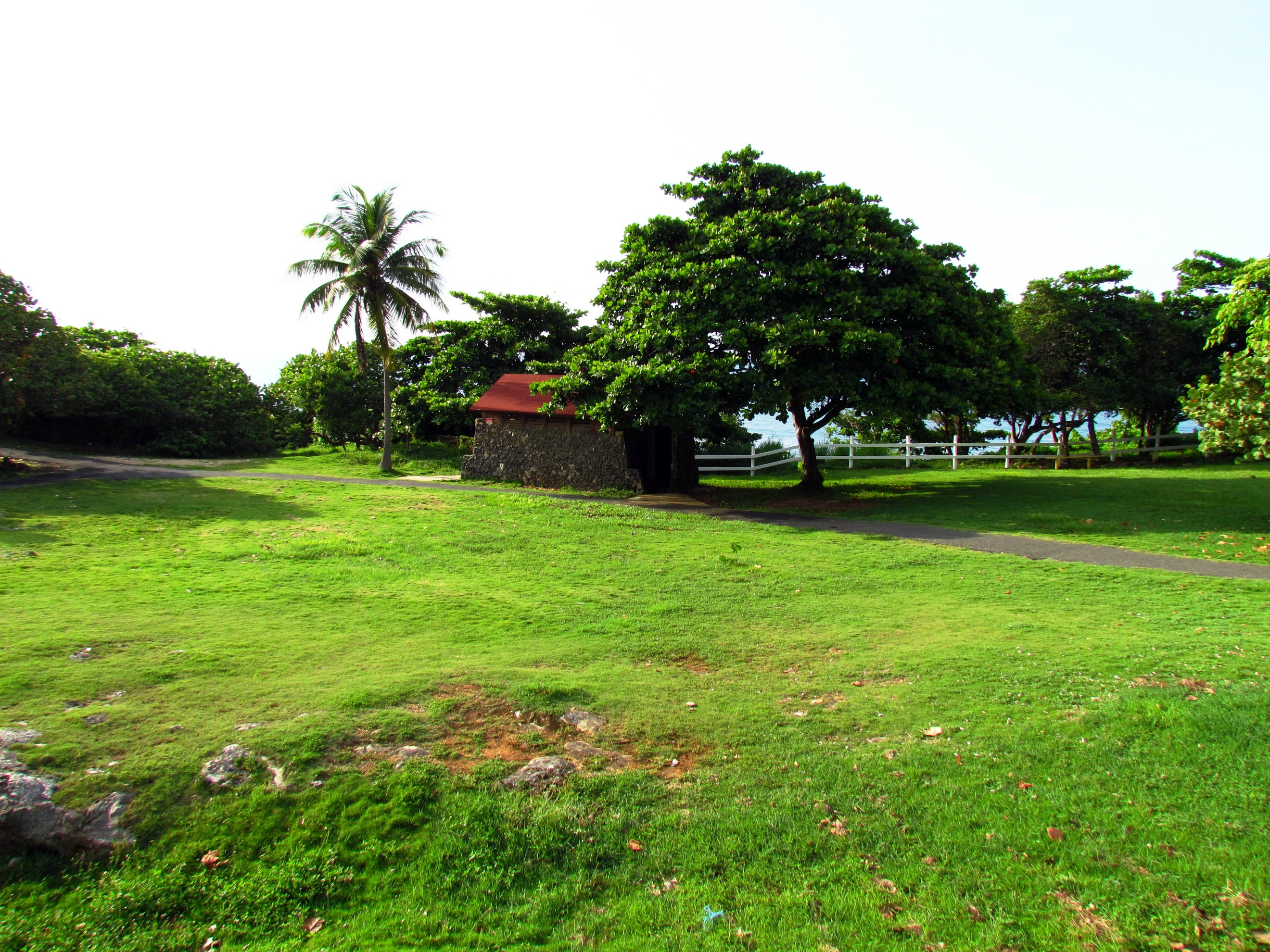
- Recreation area in Guajataca

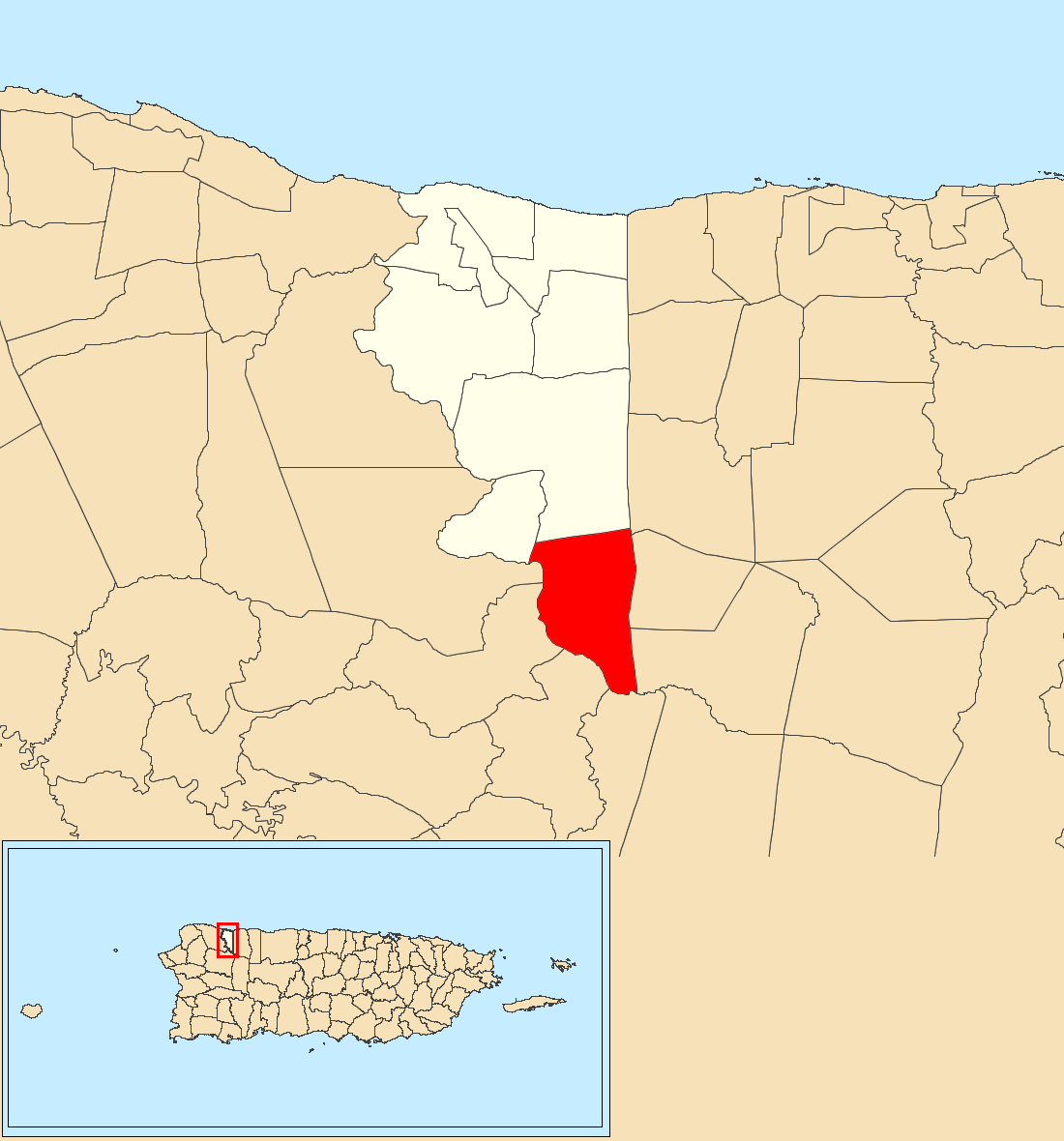
- Location of Guajataca within the municipality of Quebradillas shown in red

- Location of Puerto Rico
- Coordinates: 18°23′25″N 66°54′34″W
- Commonwealth: Puerto Rico
- Municipality: Quebradillas

Area
  - Total: 3.28 sq mi (8.5 km^{2})
  - Land: 2.89 sq mi (7.5 km^{2})
  - Water: 0.39 sq mi (1.0 km^{2})
- Elevation: 863 ft (263 m)

Population (2010)
  - Total: 1,611
  - Density: 559.4/sq mi (216.0/km^{2})
- Source: 2010 Census
- Time zone: UTC−4 (AST)
- ZIP Code: 00678
- Area code: 787/939

Guajataca is a barrio in the municipality of Quebradillas, Puerto Rico. Its population in 2010 was 1,611.

Historical population
Census	Pop.	Note	%±
1900	666		—
1910	702		5.4%
1920	952		35.6%
1930	1,095		15.0%
1940	1,164		6.3%
1950	1,393		19.7%
1960	1,438		3.2%
1970	1,372		−4.6%
1980	1,457		6.2%
1990	1,429		−1.9%
2000	1,622		13.5%
2010	1,611		−0.7%
U.S. Decennial Census; 1899 (shown as 1900) 1910-1930; 1930-1950 1980-2000 2010

== History ==
Guajataca was in Spain's gazetteers until Puerto Rico was ceded by Spain in the aftermath of the Spanish–American War under the terms of the Treaty of Paris of 1898 and became an unincorporated territory of the United States. In 1899, the United States Department of War conducted a census of Puerto Rico finding that the population of Guajataca barrio was 666.

== Sectors ==
Barrios (which are, in contemporary times, roughly comparable to minor civil divisions) in turn are further subdivided into smaller local populated place areas/units called sectores (sectors in English). The types of sectores may vary, from normally sector to urbanización to reparto to barriada to residencial, among others.

The following sectors are in Guajataca barrio:

Carretera 119, Carretera 453, Sector Charcas, Sector Cico Hernández, Sector Julio Nieves, Sector Las Palmas, Sector Los Jaca, Sector Los Méndez, Sector Los Vargas, Sector Los Vélez, Sector Man Rodríguez, Sector Margarita, Sector Medina, Sector Potracio Nieves, Sector Pozada de Amor, Sector Riego, and Sector Román.

== See also ==
- List of communities in Puerto Rico
- List of barrios and sectors of Quebradillas, Puerto Rico
