= Terranova, Quebradillas, Puerto Rico =

Barrio of Puerto Rico

Terranova
- Barrio
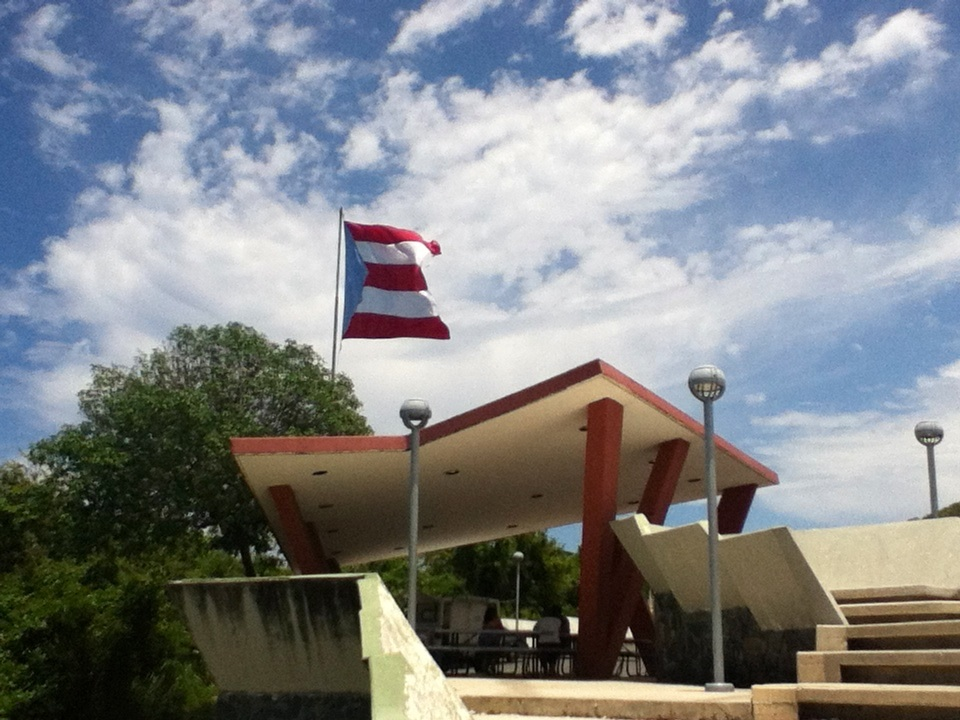
- Lookout in Terranova

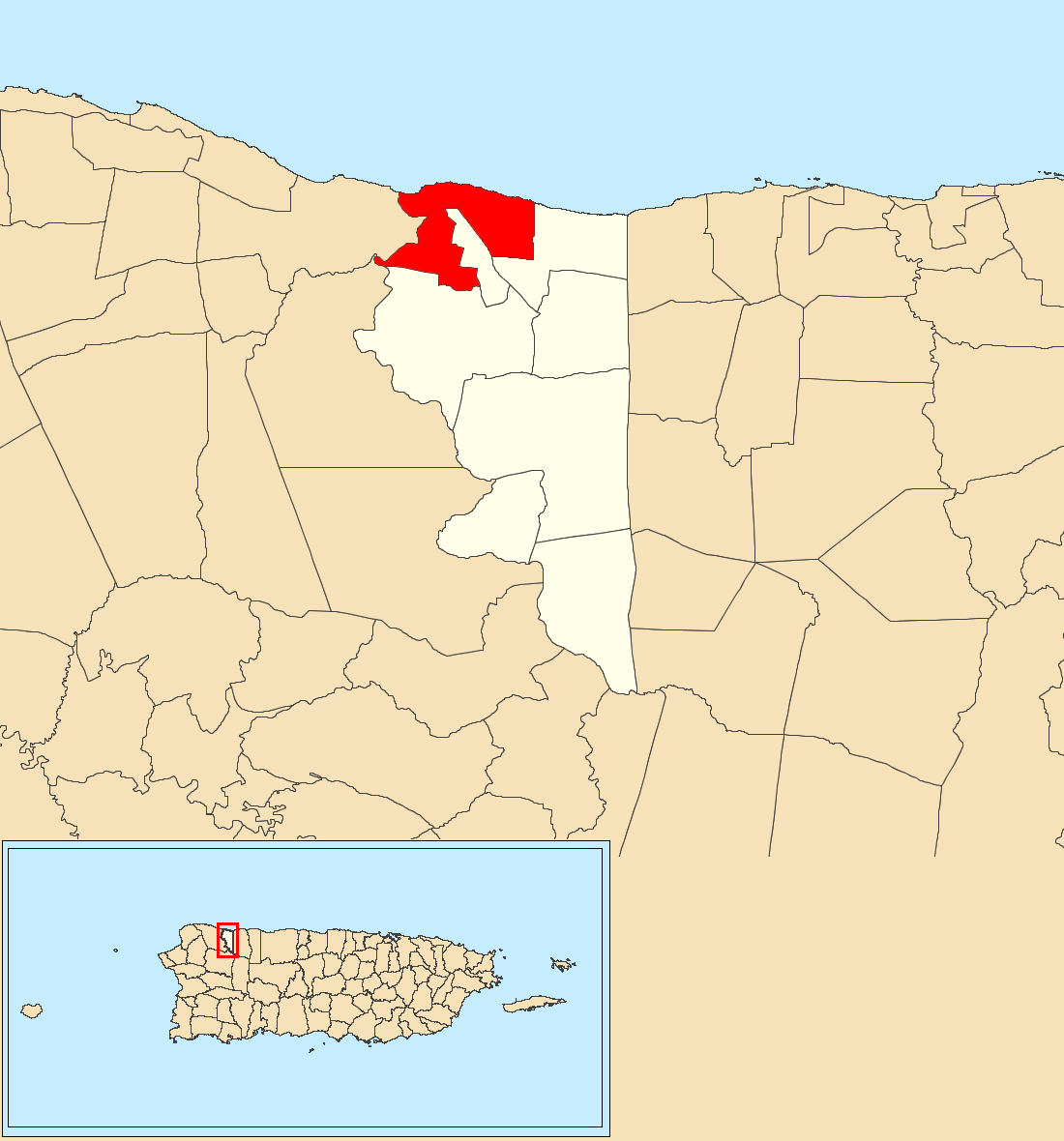
- Location of Terranova within the municipality of Quebradillas shown in red

- Location of Puerto Rico
- Coordinates: 18°29′21″N 66°56′17″W
- Commonwealth: Puerto Rico
- Municipality: Quebradillas

Area
  - Total: 2.98 sq mi (7.7 km^{2})
  - Land: 2.41 sq mi (6.2 km^{2})
  - Water: 0.57 sq mi (1.5 km^{2})
- Elevation: 302 ft (92 m)

Population (2010)
  - Total: 3,102
  - Density: 1,287.1/sq mi (497.0/km^{2})
- Source: 2010 Census
- Time zone: UTC−4 (AST)
- ZIP Code: 00678
- Area code: 787/939

Terranova is a barrio in the municipality of Quebradillas, Puerto Rico. Its population in 2010 was 3,102, and it has 19 sectors.

== History ==
Terranova was in Spain's gazetteers until Puerto Rico was ceded by Spain in the aftermath of the Spanish–American War under the terms of the Treaty of Paris of 1898 and became an unincorporated territory of the United States. In 1899, the United States Department of War conducted a census of Puerto Rico finding that the population of Terranova barrio was 779.

Historical population
Census	Pop.	Note	%±
1900	779		—
1910	789		1.3%
1920	995		26.1%
1930	996		0.1%
1940	1,423		42.9%
1950	1,618		13.7%
1960	1,382		−14.6%
1970	0		−100.0%
1980	3,298		—
1990	3,592		8.9%
2000	3,841		6.9%
2010	3,102		−19.2%
U.S. Decennial Census; 1899 (shown as 1900) 1910-1930; 1930-1950 1980-2000 2010

== Sectors ==
Barrios (which are, in contemporary times, roughly comparable to minor civil divisions) in turn are further subdivided into smaller local populated place areas/units called sectores (sectors in English). The types of sectores may vary, from normally sector to urbanización to reparto to barriada to residencial, among others.

The following sectors are in Terranova barrio:

Calle Coliseo, Calle del Parque, Calle Las Flores, Camino Amador, Carretera 113, Carretera 477, Parcelas Terranova, Reparto Muñoz, Residencial Guarionex, Sector Estación, Sector Juan González, Sector Las Cuevitas, Sector Los Barros, Sector Los Prietos, Sector Quebrada Mala, Sector Rábano, Sector Villa Durán, Sector Villa Varguitas, and Urbanización San Rafael.

== Gallery ==
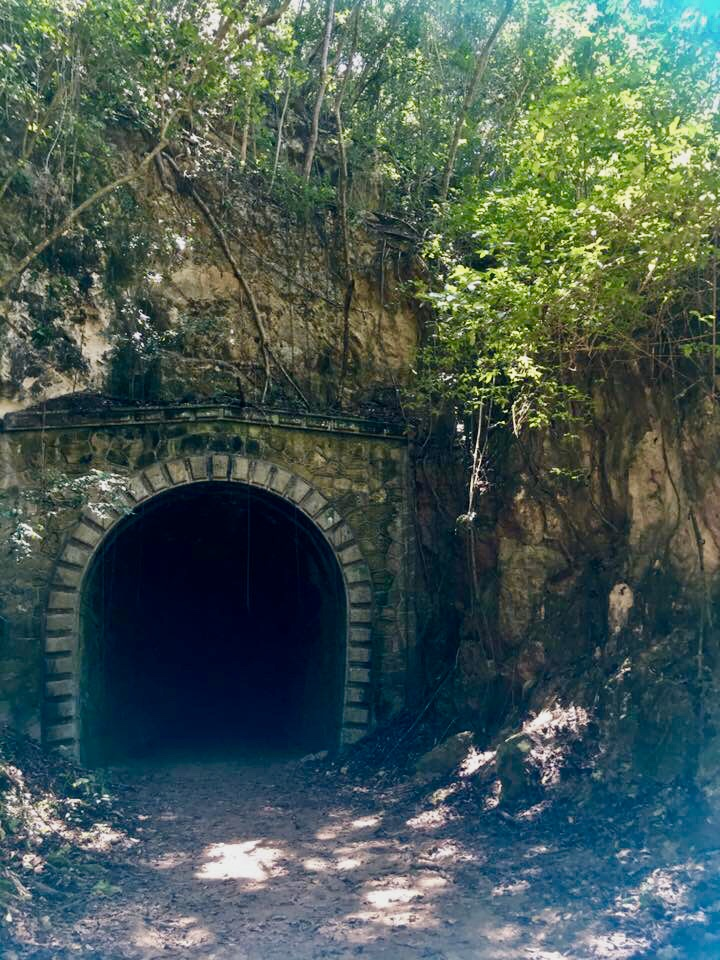
Túnel Negro in Terranova

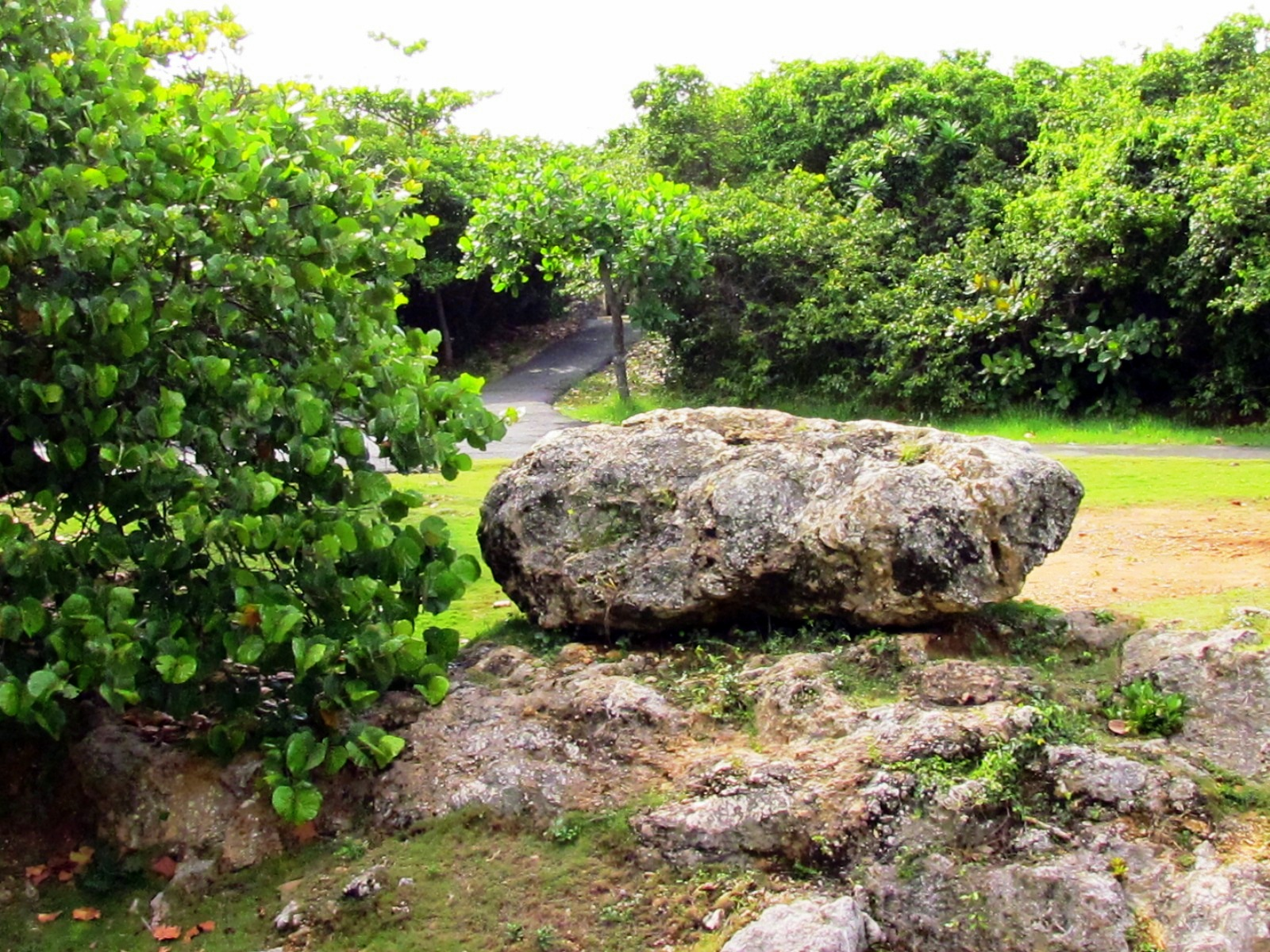
Recreational area in Terranova

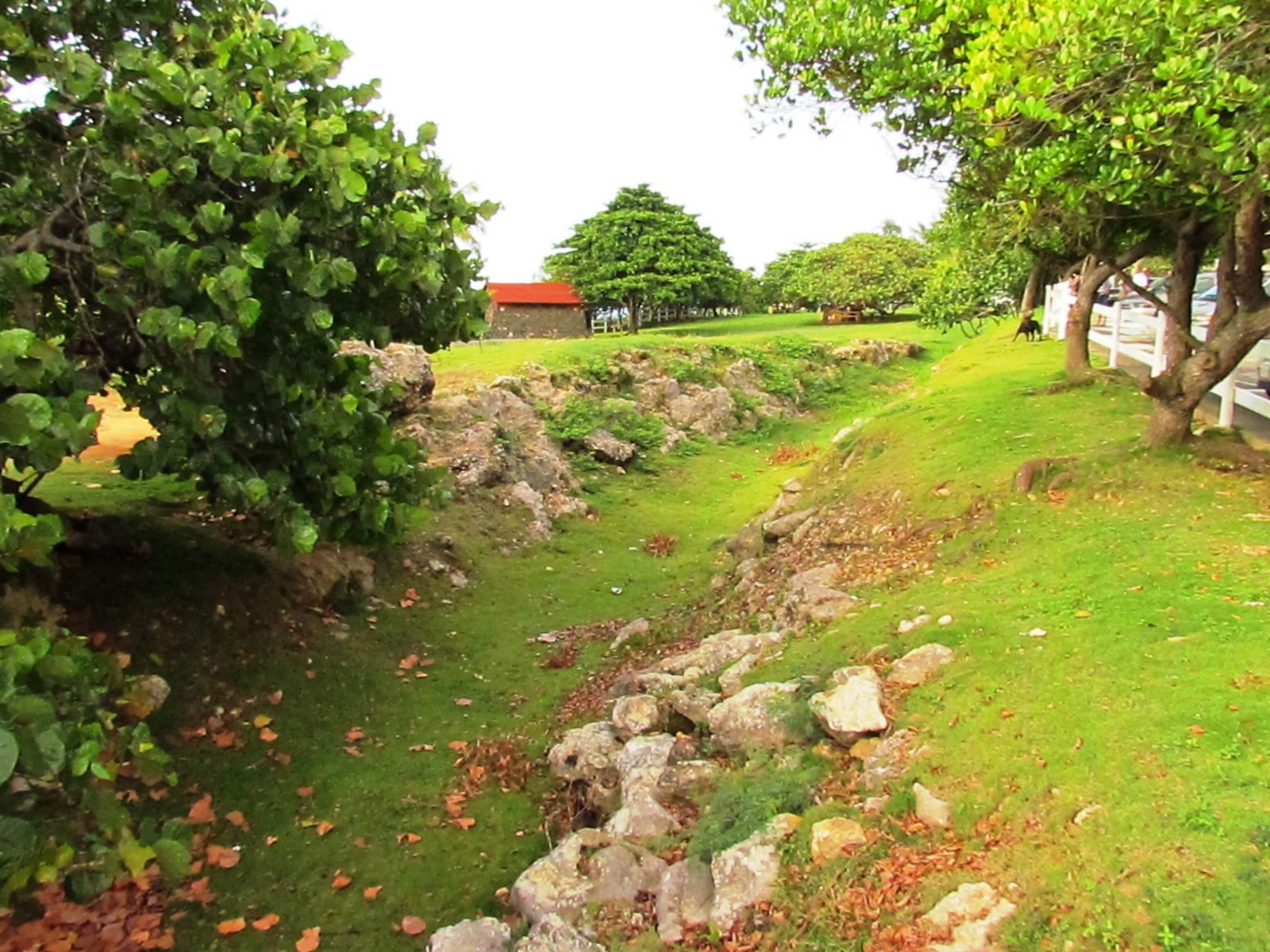
Recreational area in Terranova

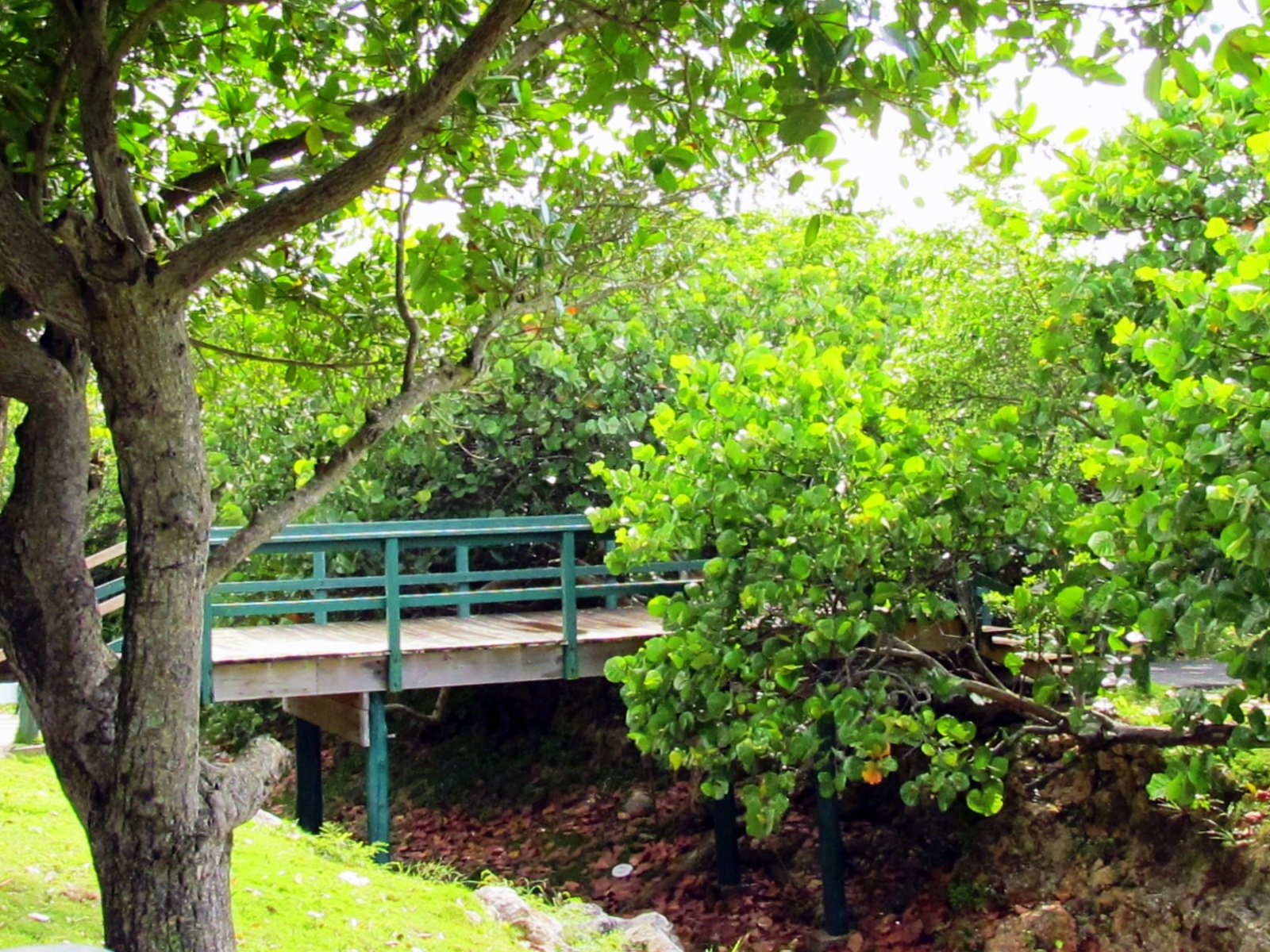
Bridge in Terranova

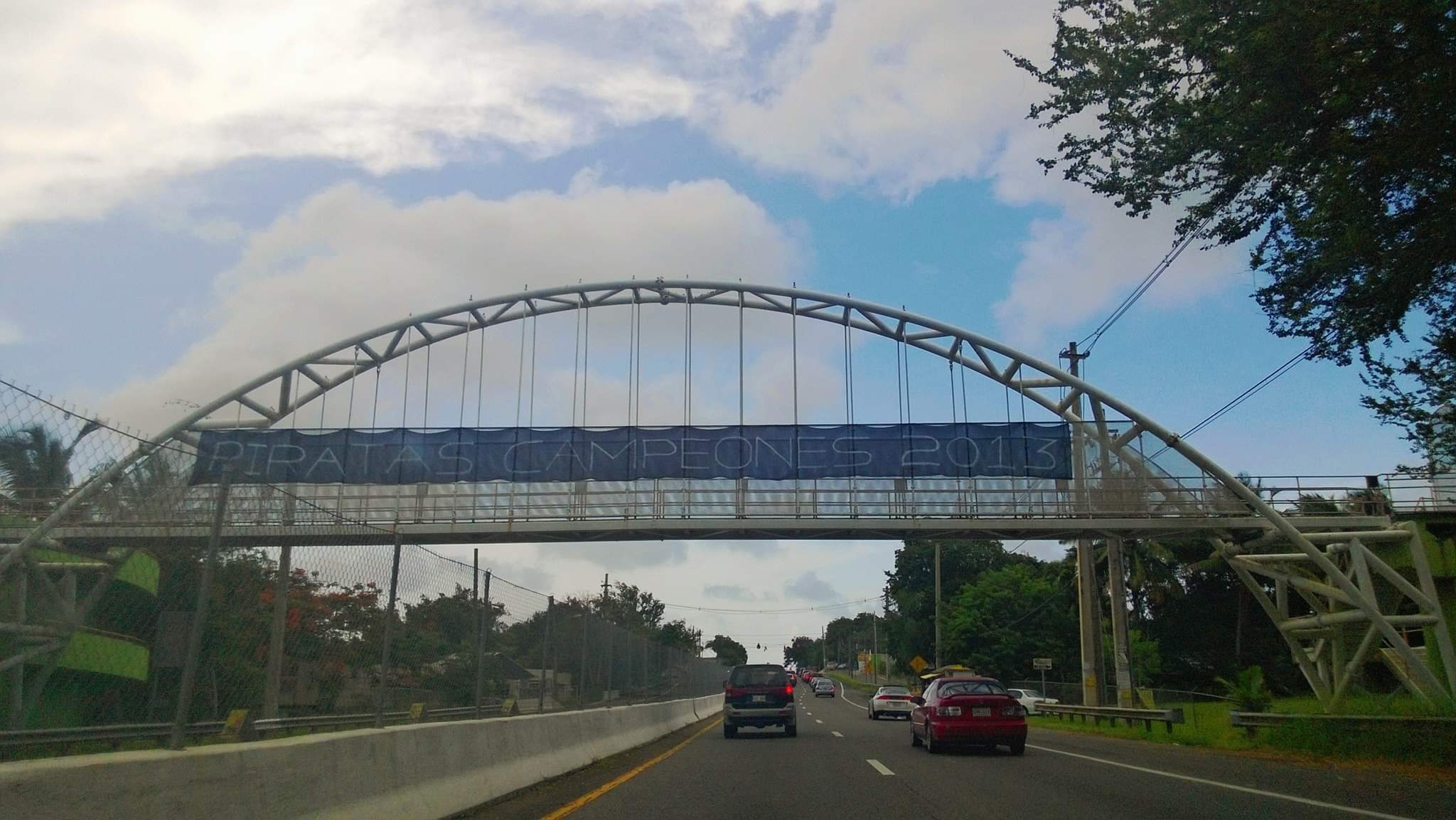
Puerto Rico Highway 2 in Terranova

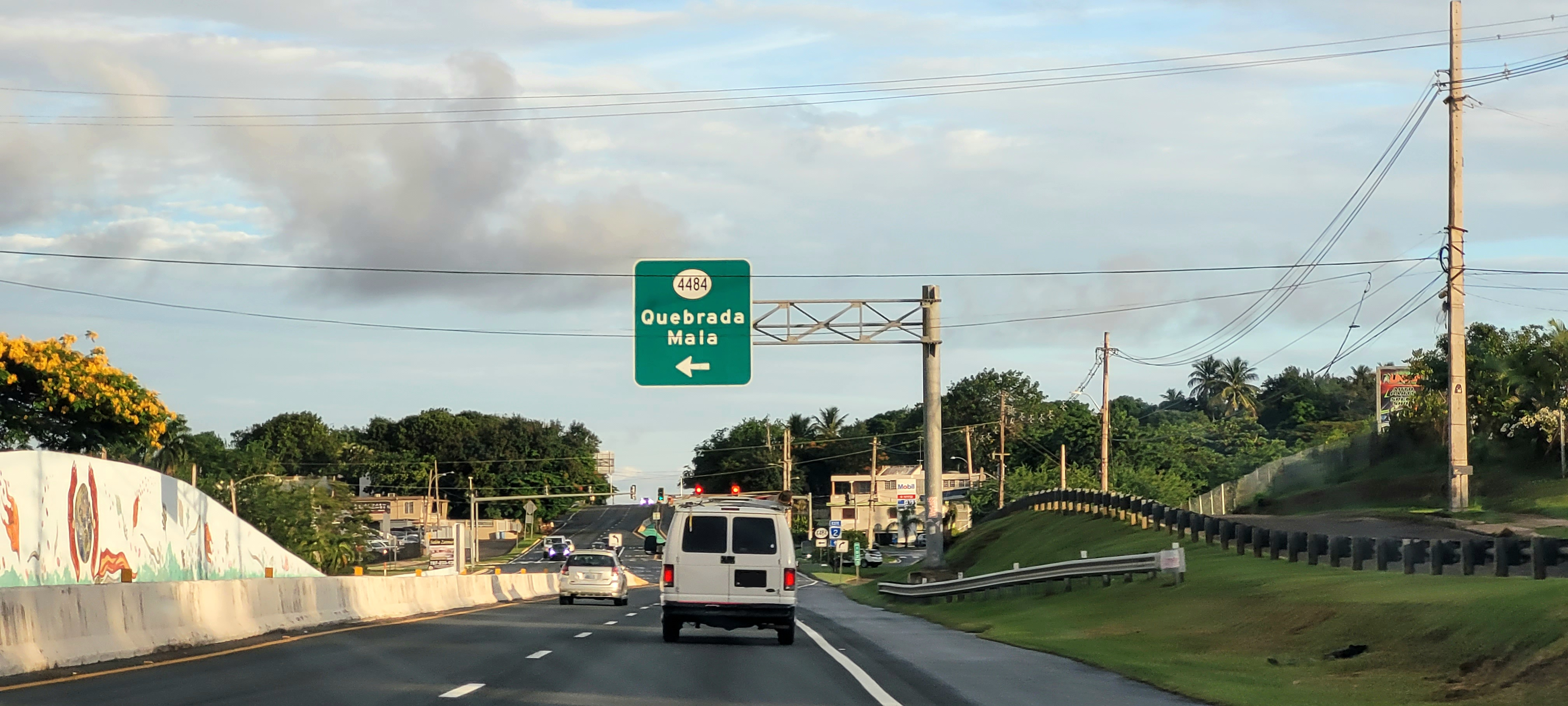
Sign for Sector Quebrada Mala in Terranova

== See also ==
- List of communities in Puerto Rico
- List of barrios and sectors of Quebradillas, Puerto Rico
