= Cocos, Quebradillas, Puerto Rico =

Barrio of Puerto Rico

Cocos
- Barrio
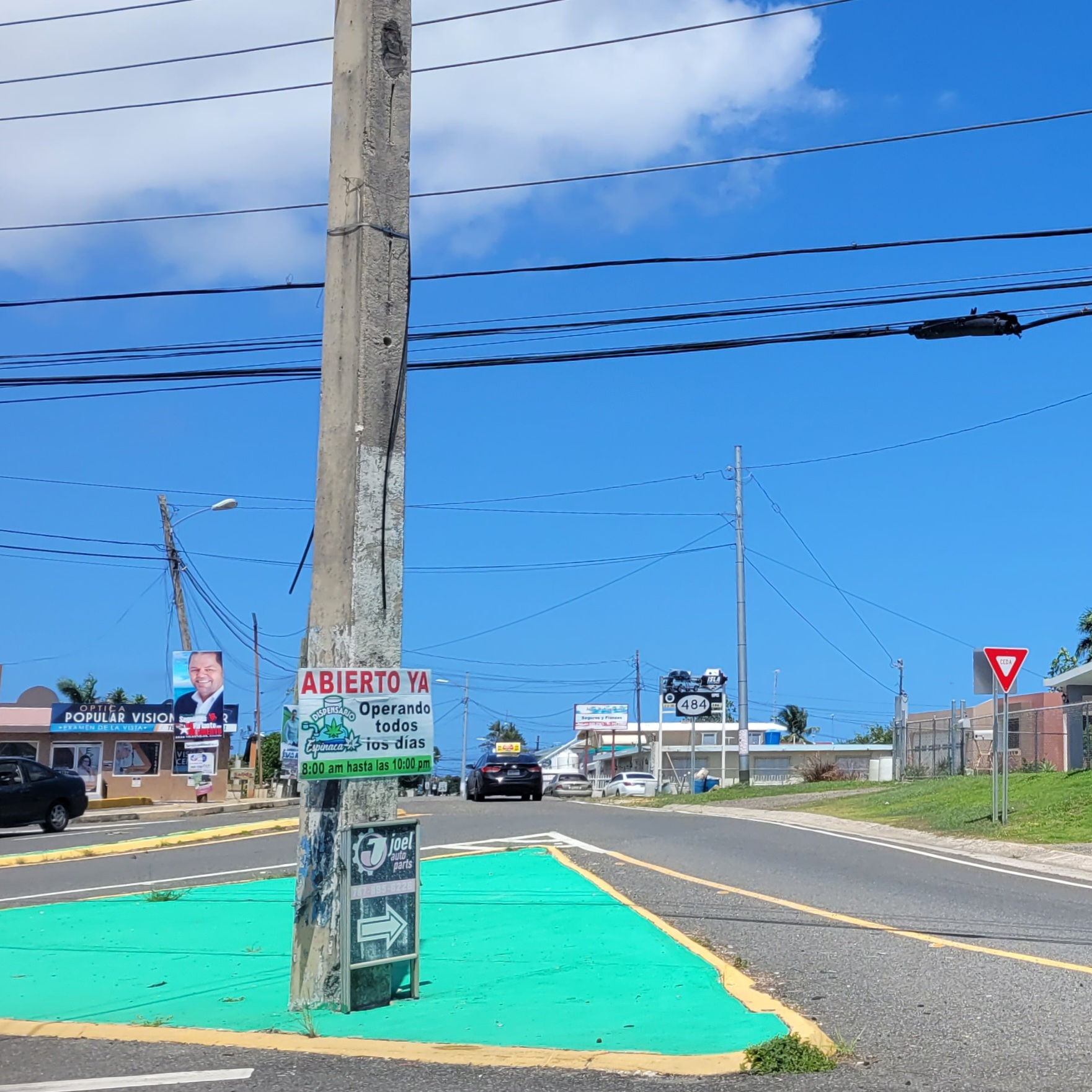
- Puerto Rico Highway 484 in Cocos

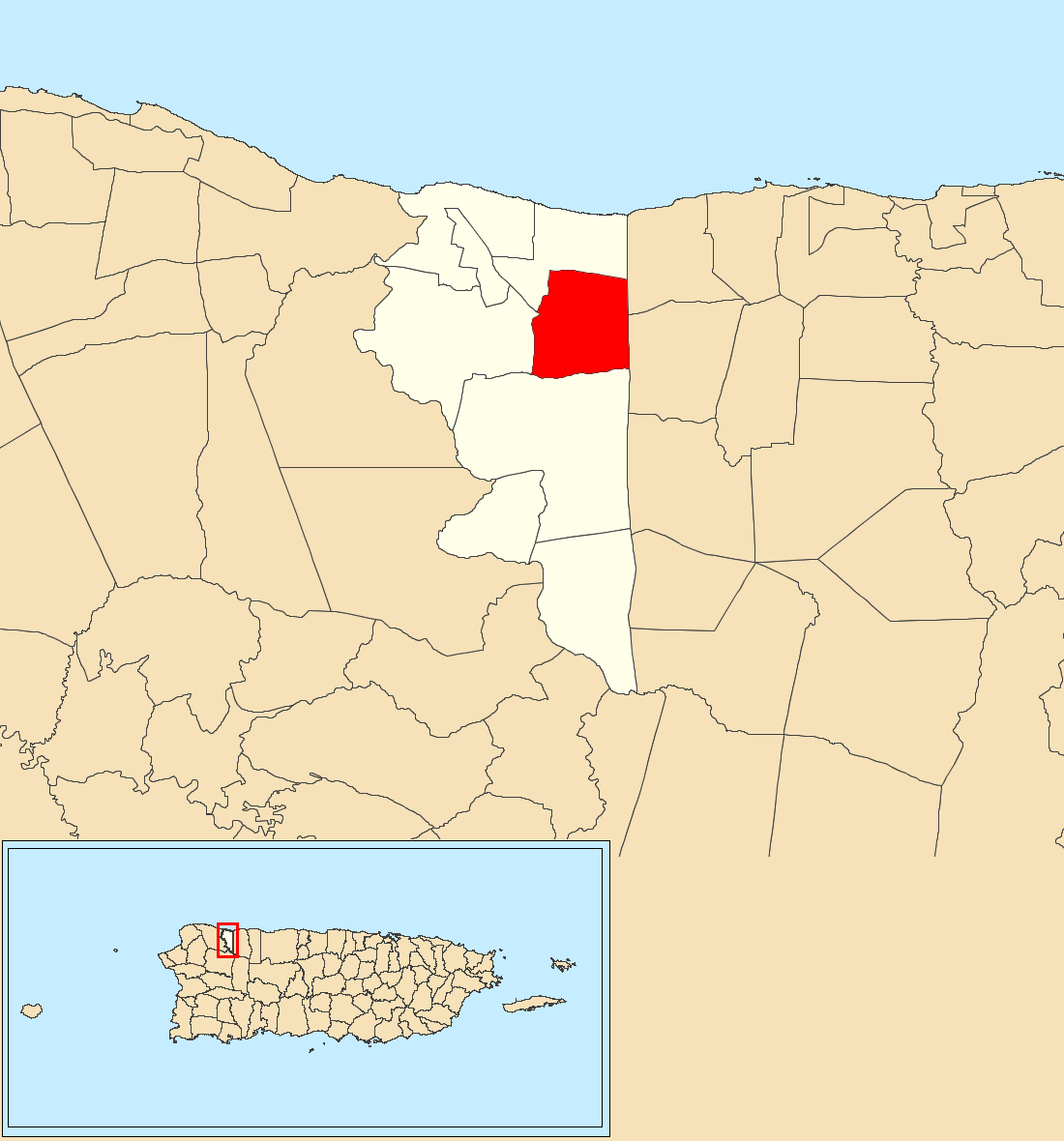
- Location of Cocos within the municipality of Quebradillas shown in red

- Location of Puerto Rico
- Coordinates: 18°27′24″N 66°54′45″W
- Commonwealth: Puerto Rico
- Municipality: Quebradillas

Area
  - Total: 2.46 sq mi (6.4 km^{2})
  - Land: 2.46 sq mi (6.4 km^{2})
  - Water: 0 sq mi (0 km^{2})
- Elevation: 459 ft (140 m)

Population (2010)
  - Total: 4,889
  - Density: 1,987.4/sq mi (767.3/km^{2})
- Source: 2010 Census
- Time zone: UTC−4 (AST)
- ZIP Code: 00678
- Area code: 787/939

Cocos is a barrio in the municipality of Quebradillas, Puerto Rico. Its population in 2010 was 4,889.

Historical population
Census	Pop.	Note	%±
1900	978		—
1910	1,206		23.3%
1920	1,252		3.8%
1930	1,384		10.5%
1940	1,521		9.9%
1950	1,852		21.8%
1960	1,945		5.0%
1970	2,804		44.2%
1980	3,442		22.8%
1990	3,734		8.5%
2000	4,569		22.4%
2010	4,889		7.0%
U.S. Decennial Census; 1899 (shown as 1900) 1910-1930; 1930-1950 1980-2000 2010

== History ==
Cocos was in Spain's gazetteers until Puerto Rico was ceded by Spain in the aftermath of the Spanish–American War under the terms of the Treaty of Paris of 1898 and became an unincorporated territory of the United States. In 1899, the United States Department of War conducted a census of Puerto Rico finding that the population of Cocos barrio was 978.

== Sectors ==
Barrios (which are, in contemporary times, roughly comparable to minor civil divisions) in turn are further subdivided into smaller local populated place areas/units called sectores (sectors in English). The types of sectores may vary, from normally sector to urbanización to reparto to barriada to residencial, among others.

The following sectors are in Cocos barrio:

Calle La Ceiba, Calle Lucía Rivera, Calle Socorro, Calle Vicentita Delís, Carretera 482, Carretera 483, Carretera 485, Carretera Ramal 484, Extensión Lamela, Parcelas Los Cocos, Reparto Amador, Reparto Bordel, Residencial Francisco Vigo Salas, Residencial Villa Julia, Sector Arturo Jiménez, Sector Cuatro Calles, Sector Dámaso Soto, Sector El Verde, Sector Felipe Cruz, Sector Hoyo Brujo (Fito Valle), Sector Julián Hernández, Sector La Ceiba, Sector La Cuesta, Sector Lajas, Sector Las Piedras, Sector Los González, Sector Los Lugo, Sector Los Paganes, Sector Pallens, Urbanización Ávila, Urbanización El Retiro, Urbanización Hacienda Guadalupe, Urbanización Kennedy, Urbanización Las Ceibas (from km 99.1 of Carretera 2), and Urbanización Villa Norma.

== See also ==
- List of communities in Puerto Rico
- List of barrios and sectors of Quebradillas, Puerto Rico
