= San José, Quebradillas, Puerto Rico =

Barrio of Puerto Rico

San José
- Barrio
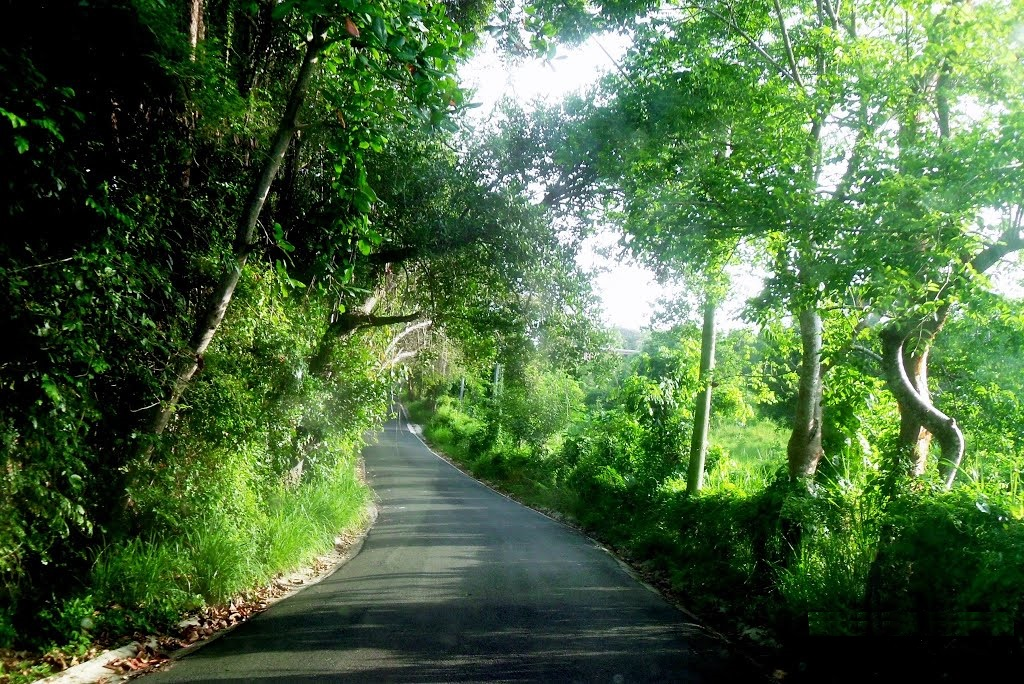
- Road in San José

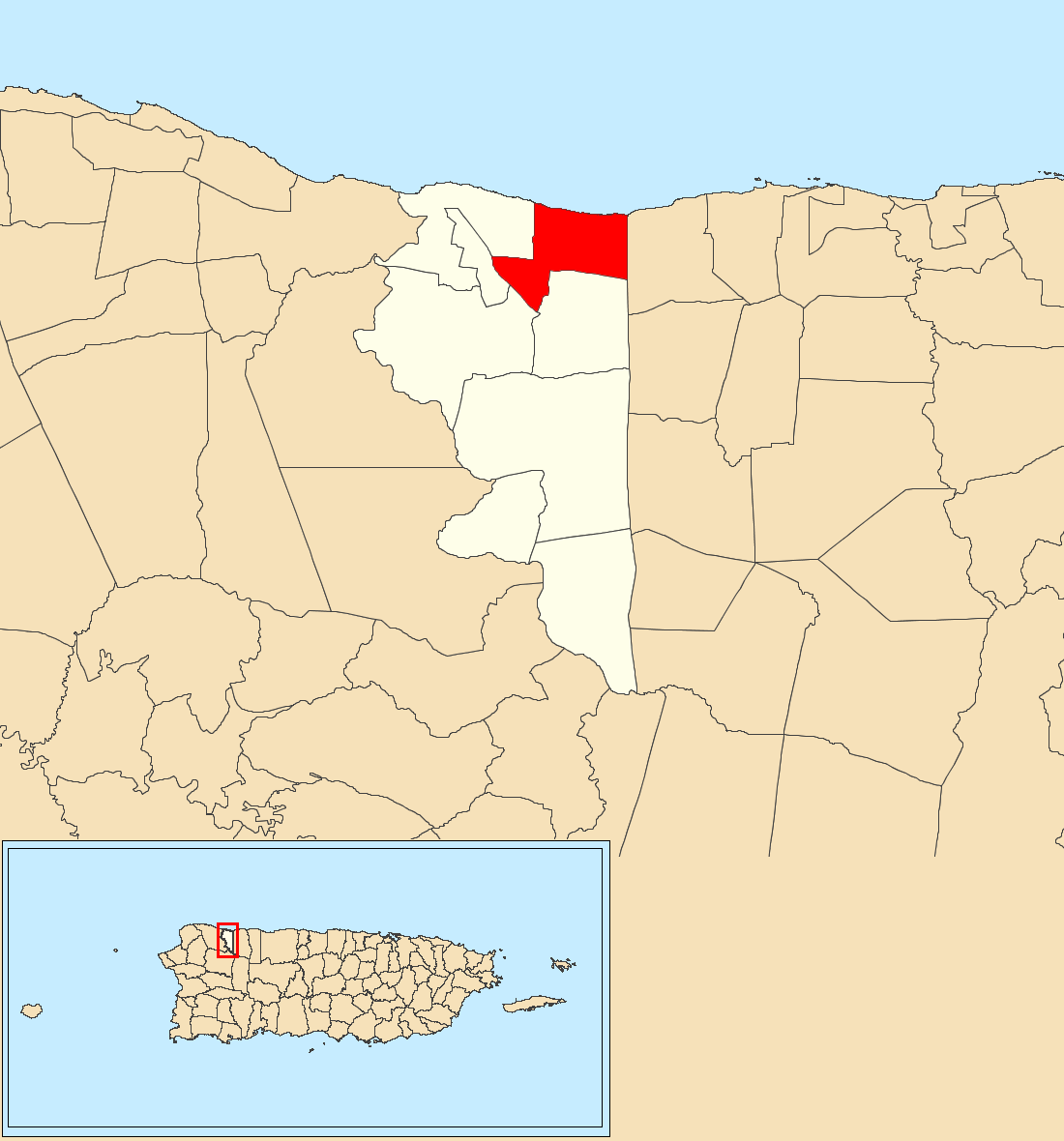
- Location of San José within the municipality of Quebradillas shown in red

- Location of Puerto Rico
- Coordinates: 18°28′38″N 66°55′05″W
- Commonwealth: Puerto Rico
- Municipality: Quebradillas

Area
  - Total: 2.46 sq mi (6.4 km^{2})
  - Land: 2.04 sq mi (5.3 km^{2})
  - Water: 0.42 sq mi (1.1 km^{2})
- Elevation: 341 ft (104 m)

Population (2010)
  - Total: 2,986
  - Density: 1,470.9/sq mi (567.9/km^{2})
- Source: 2010 Census
- Time zone: UTC−4 (AST)
- ZIP Code: 00678
- Area code: 787/939

San José is a barrio in the municipality of Quebradillas, Puerto Rico. Its population in 2010 was 2,986.

Historical population
Census	Pop.	Note	%±
1900	687		—
1910	725		5.5%
1920	799		10.2%
1930	791		−1.0%
1940	919		16.2%
1950	1,052		14.5%
1960	864		−17.9%
1970	0		−100.0%
1980	1,337		—
1990	2,085		55.9%
2000	2,532		21.4%
2010	2,986		17.9%
U.S. Decennial Census; 1899 (shown as 1900) 1910-1930; 1930-1950 1980-2000 2010

== History ==
San José was in Spain's gazetteers until Puerto Rico was ceded by Spain in the aftermath of the Spanish–American War under the terms of the Treaty of Paris of 1898 and became an unincorporated territory of the United States. In 1899, the United States Department of War conducted a census of Puerto Rico finding that the population of San José barrio was 687.

== Sectors ==
Barrios (which are, in contemporary times, roughly comparable to minor civil divisions) in turn are further sub-divided into smaller local populated place areas/units called sectores (sectors in English). The types of sectores may vary, from normally sector to urbanización to reparto to barriada to residencial, among others.

The following sectors are in San José barrio:

Calle San Miguel, Camimo de Aniceto Román, Carretera 485, Condominio Paraíso del Atlántico, Residencial Parque del Retiro, Sector Jayuya, Sector Yeguada (colindancia con Camuy en Carretera 435), and Urbanización Brisa Tropical.

== Gallery ==
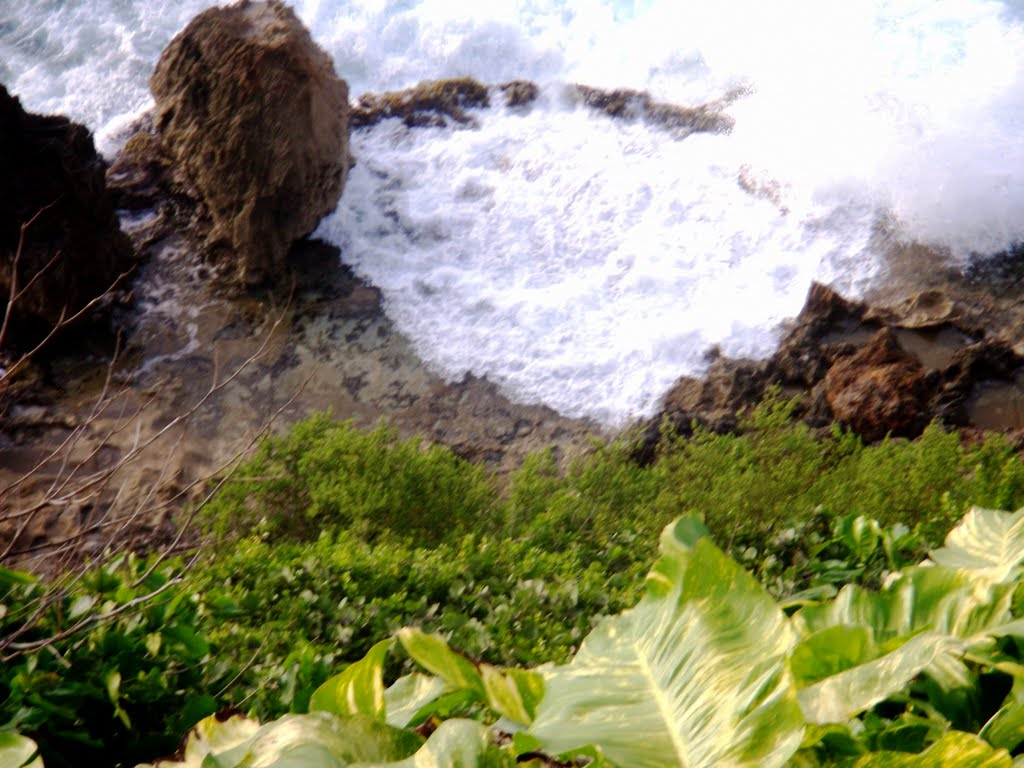
View of Puerto Hermina Beach

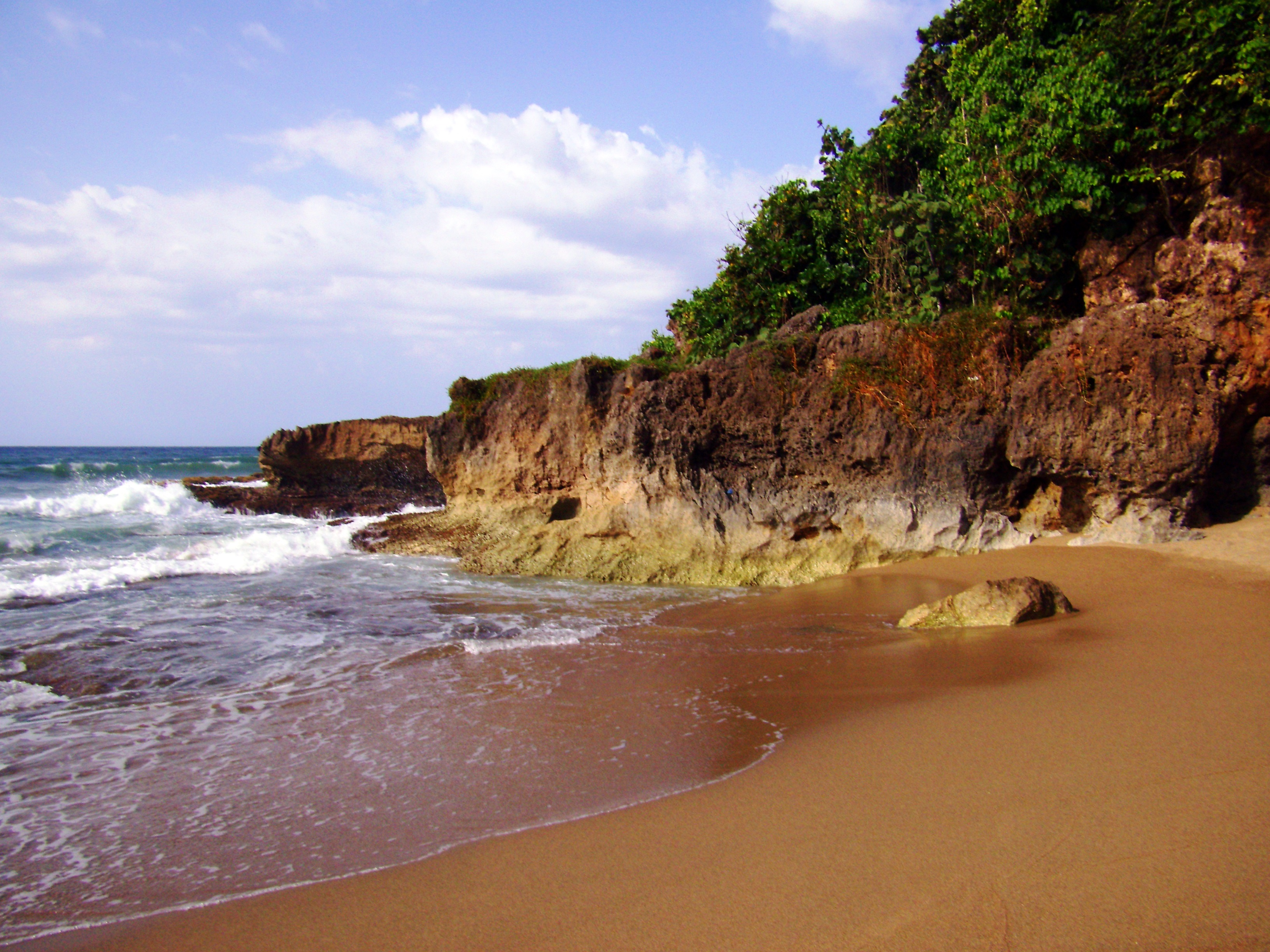
Puerto Hermina Beach in San José

== See also ==
- List of communities in Puerto Rico
- List of barrios and sectors of Quebradillas, Puerto Rico
