= Quebradillas, Puerto Rico =

Town and municipality of Puerto Rico

Quebradillas Municipio de Quebradillas
- Town and Municipality
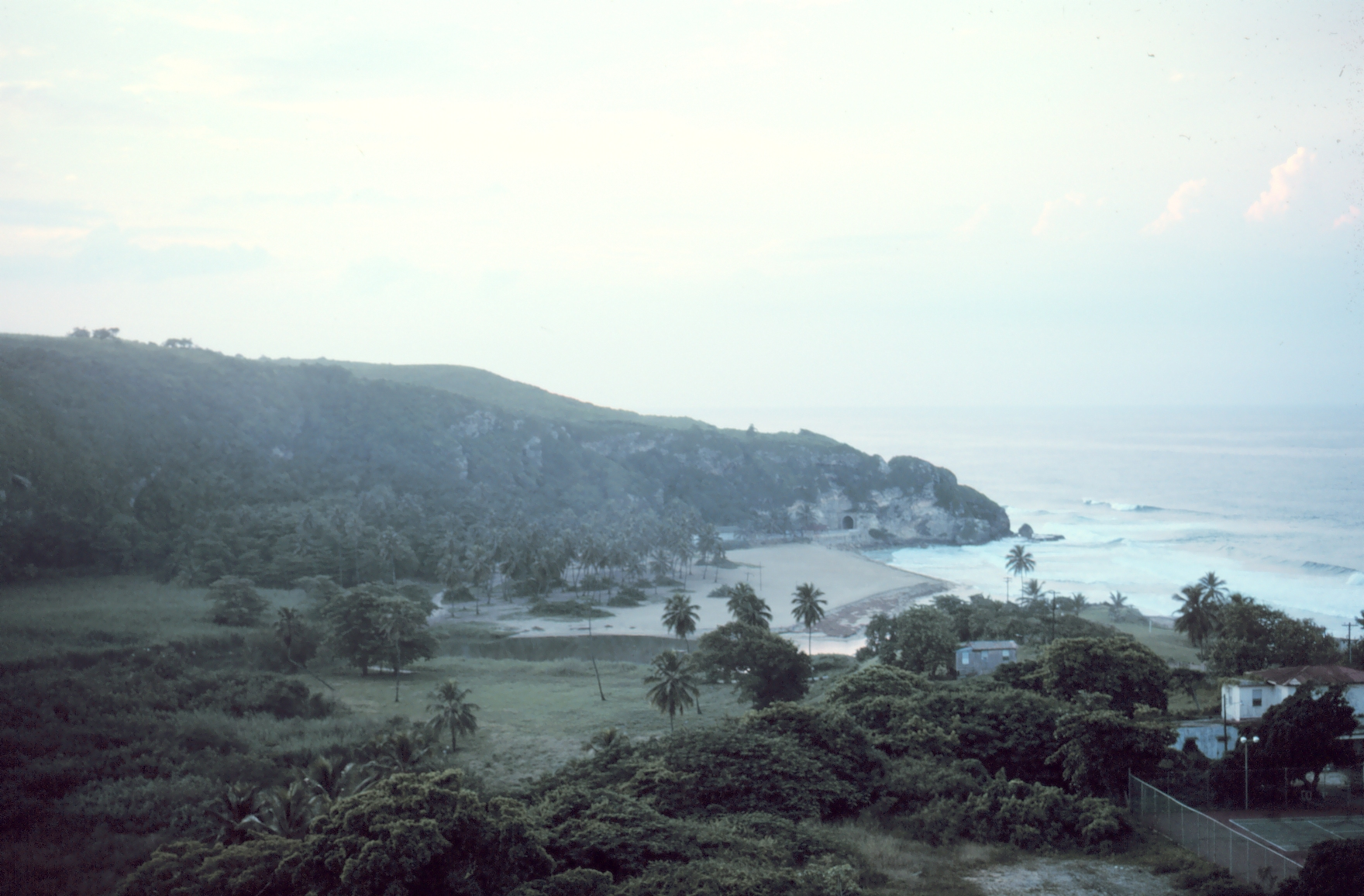
- Quebradillas Beach

- Flag Coat of arms
- Nicknames: "La Guarida del Pirata", "La Ciudad del Cooperativismo"
- Anthem: "De lejos canto, porque anhela el corazón"
- Map of Puerto Rico highlighting Quebradillas Municipality
- Coordinates: 18°28′26″N 66°56′19″W
- Sovereign state: United States
- Commonwealth: Puerto Rico
- Settled: 1820
- Founded: June 6, 1823
- Founder: José Ramos Velez
- Barrios: 8 barrios: Cacao; Charcas; Cocos; Guajataca; Quebradillas barrio-pueblo; San Antonio; San José; Terranova

Government
  - Mayor: Heriberto Vélez (PPD)
  - Senatorial dist.: 3 – Arecibo
  - Representative dist.: 15

Area
  - Total: 22.7 sq mi (58.8 km^{2})
  - Land: 23 sq mi (60 km^{2})
  - Water: 4.50 sq mi (11.66 km^{2})

Population (2020)
  - Total: 23,638
  - Estimate (2025): 23,189 ▼
  - Rank: 51st in Puerto Rico
  - Density: 1,000/sq mi (390/km^{2})
- Demonym: Quebradillanos
- Time zone: UTC−4 (AST)
- ZIP Code: 00678
- Area code: 787/939
- Website: www.quebradillas.pr.gov

Quebradillas (Spanish pronunciation: [keβɾaˈðiʝas], locally [ˌkeβɾaˈðiʝaʔ]) is a town and municipality in Puerto Rico located in the northern shore bordering the Atlantic Ocean, north of San Sebastián; east of Isabela; and west of Camuy. Quebradillas is spread over seven barrios and Quebradillas Pueblo (the downtown area and the administrative center of the city). It is part of the San Juan–Bayamón–Caguas metropolitan area.

Quebradillas is called "La Guarida del Pirata" (The Pirate's Hideout). A well-known beach in the area, Puerto Hermina, is home to an old structure known to have been a hiding place for pirates and their contraband.

== History ==
The town was founded in 1823 by Felipe Ruiz. There were many factors that cause the inhabitants of this territory of Puerto Rico to be independent from the towns that formed the Hato de la Tuna resulting in the formation of a new municipality. The town lacked chapels or churches, religious services nor priests, a place to bury the dead, a post office, and quality roads to transport. They relied on the neighboring municipalities of Camuy, Hatillo and Isabela. This would however be a problem during the rainy seasons when the Río Camuy and Río Guajataca water level rose resulting in closed off passage to the other municipalities and would sometimes take up to a week for the water level to return to normal. This led the residents of the area to organize a corporation that would look after the political, economic and administrative interests of "Las Quebradillas" and its jurisdiction. This town derives its name from the large number of streams flowing through it. Quebradillas means "small streams".

Puerto Rico was ceded by Spain in the aftermath of the Spanish–American War under the terms of the Treaty of Paris of 1898 and became a territory of the United States. In 1899, the United States Department of War conducted a census of Puerto Rico finding that the population of Quebradillas was 7,432.

On September 20, 2017 Hurricane Maria struck the island of Puerto Rico. In Quebradillas, 800 concrete barriers had to be built to stabilize the Guajataca reservoir which suffered a structural failure and was causing a "life-threatening situation". "It’s a structural failure. I don’t have any more details," Governor Ricardo Rosselló stated. "We’re trying to evacuate as many people as possible." Rosselló ordered the Puerto Rico National Guard and the Police to help assist in the evacuation effort downstream. The dam lies across the Guajataca River to form a reservoir that can hold roughly 11 billion gallons of water.

In Quebradillas, infrastructure and about 2200 homes were damaged or completely destroyed.

== Geography ==
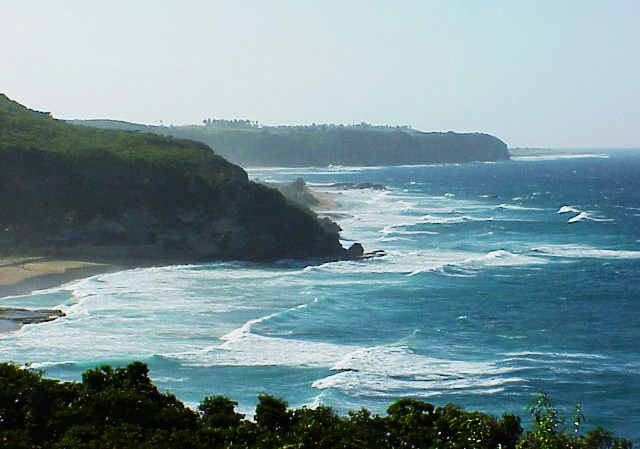
The coastline and Guajataca Tunnel at Guajataca Beach

Quebradillas, located in the Northern Karst, borders on the Atlantic Ocean, is north of San Sebastián; east of Isabela, and west of Camuy. Quebradillas is home to one of the 20 designated forest preserves in Puerto Rico, the Guajataca State Forest. The forest serves as a great example of an unusual topography known as karst country. Karst is characterized by dissolved limestone formations such as sinkholes and haystack-shaped hills known as "mogotes". It is also home to the beautiful man-made reservoir, Guajataca Lake (2.5 mi or 4.0 km long), where you can fish for largemouth bass, peacock bass, tilapia and bluegill (in Spanish known as "chopa"). You can also go hiking or camping. The Puerto Rico Council of the Boy Scouts of America maintains a campground on the lake known as Camp Guajataka. The name Guajataca comes from the name Wahataka, a Taíno chief who lived in this area. This Indian chief also gives his name to Guajataca Beach to the north where Río Guajataca flowing from Guajataca Lake meets the Atlantic Ocean. Guajataca Beach is popular with surfers and is known for its white sands and wild waves. This beach is ideal for sunning and collecting seashells.

=== Barrios ===
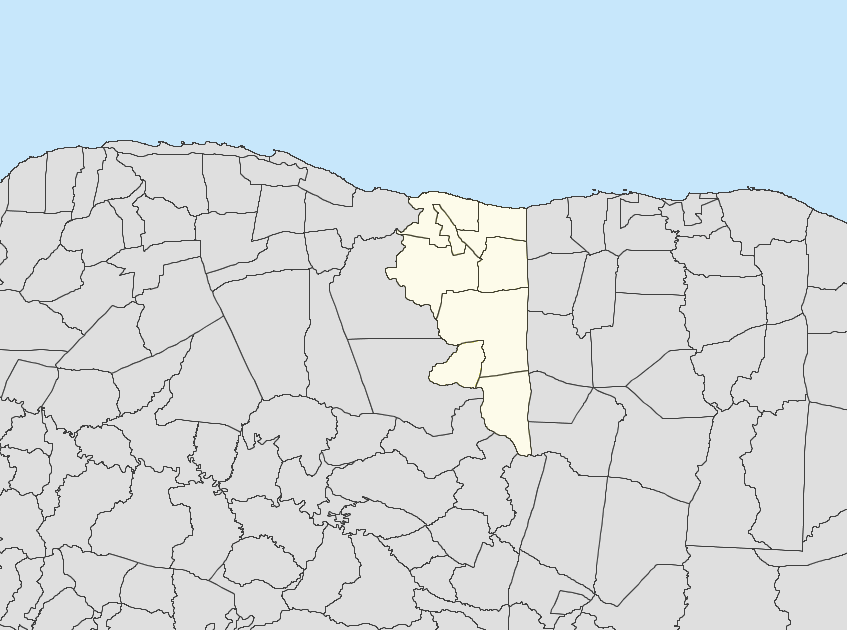
Subdivisions of Quebradillas.

Like all municipalities of Puerto Rico, Quebradillas is subdivided into barrios. The municipal buildings, central square and large Catholic church are located in a barrio referred to as "el pueblo".

1. Cacao
2. Charcas
3. Cocos
4. Guajataca
5. Quebradillas barrio-pueblo
6. San Antonio
7. San José
8. Terranova

=== Sectors ===
Barrios (which are like minor civil divisions) are further subdivided into smaller areas called sectores (sectors in English). The types of sectores may vary, from normally sector to urbanización to reparto to barriada to residencial, among others.

=== Special Communities ===
Comunidades Especiales de Puerto Rico (Special Communities of Puerto Rico) are marginalized communities whose citizens are experiencing a certain amount of social exclusion. A map shows these communities occur in nearly every municipality of the commonwealth. Of the 742 places that were on the list in 2014, the following barrios, communities, sectors, or neighborhoods were in Quebradillas: Guajataca, Montadero, Parcelas Italas in Terranova, San Antonio, and Sector Las Piedras Barrio Cocos.

== Climate ==
The general climate of the town is tropical.

Climate data for Quebradillas, Puerto Rico
Month	Jan	Feb	Mar	Apr	May	Jun	Jul	Aug	Sep	Oct	Nov	Dec	Year
Mean daily maximum °F (°C)	82.5 (28.1)	82.8 (28.2)	83.6 (28.7)	84.6 (29.2)	85.8 (29.9)	86.8 (30.4)	87.1 (30.6)	87.4 (30.8)	87.7 (30.9)	87.5 (30.8)	85.8 (29.9)	84.1 (28.9)	85.5 (29.7)
Mean daily minimum °F (°C)	66.3 (19.1)	65.4 (18.6)	66.1 (18.9)	67.6 (19.8)	68.7 (20.4)	69.9 (21.1)	71.3 (21.8)	71.4 (21.9)	71.3 (21.8)	70.1 (21.2)	68.7 (20.4)	67.6 (19.8)	68.7 (20.4)
Average precipitation inches (mm)	4.2 (110)	3.0 (76)	3.4 (86)	4.5 (110)	6.2 (160)	4.8 (120)	3.3 (84)	4.7 (120)	4.7 (120)	5.0 (130)	5.9 (150)	5.0 (130)	54.5 (1,380)
Source: Weatherbase

== Demographics ==
Historical population
Census	Pop.	Note	%±
1900	7,432		—
1910	8,152		9.7%
1920	9,404		15.4%
1930	10,190		8.4%
1940	11,494		12.8%
1950	13,712		19.3%
1960	13,075		−4.6%
1970	15,582		19.2%
1980	19,728		26.6%
1990	21,425		8.6%
2000	25,450		18.8%
2010	25,919		1.8%
2020	23,638		−8.8%
2025 (est.)	23,189	▼	−1.9%
U.S. Decennial Census; 1899 (shown as 1900) 1910–1930; 1930–1950 1960–2000 2010 2020

== Tourism ==
=== Landmarks and places of interest ===
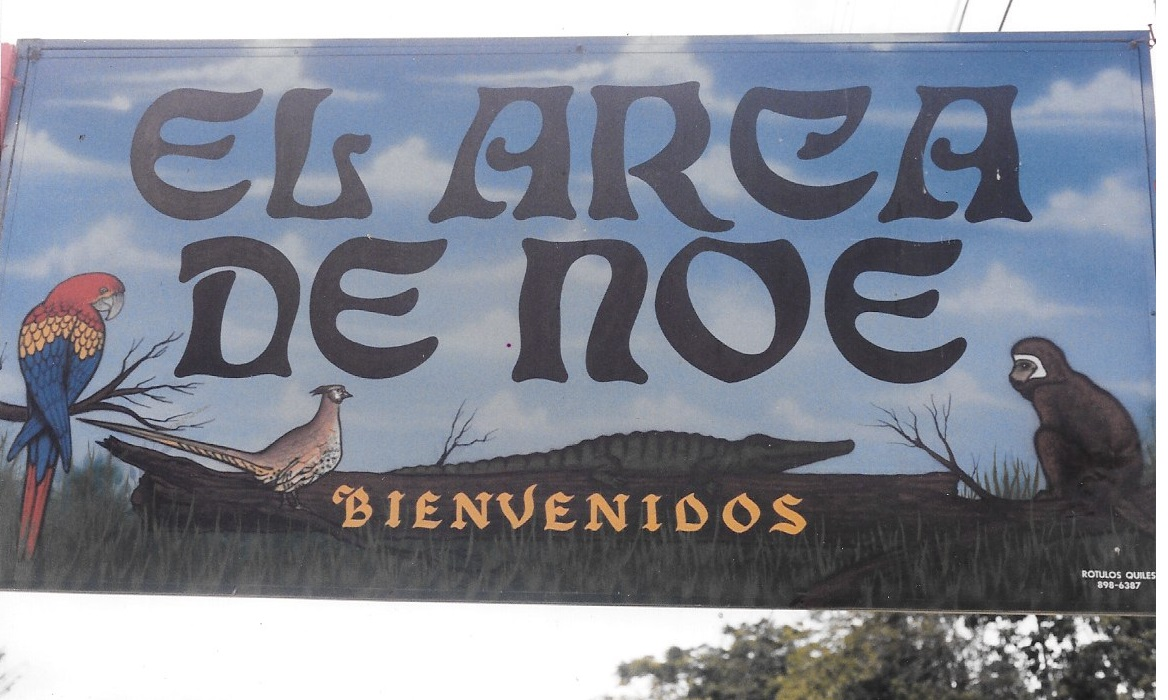
Welcome sign for El Arca de Noé (Noah's Ark), a former private zoo in Quebradillas

There are 6 beaches in Quebradillas.

The town of Quebradillas had a private zoo called El Arca de Noé (Noah's Ark), which was in operation for about 50 years. In 2012 it was closed after its owners turned 90 years old and could no longer care for the animals, as a result they were moved to the Dr. Juan A. Rivero Zoo. The town also had El Museo de Muñecas (Quebradillas Doll Museum) which housed over 1,000 Barbie dolls in Cocos.

The main attractions of Quebradillas are:

- El Merendero (Scenic Park and Ocean Look-Out)
- Miradero Guajataca
- Guajataca Lake Reservoir
- The Liberty Theater (downtown)
- Puerto Hermina Beach Pirate Ruins contains rock carvings such as La Cabeza del Indio (The Indian Face)
- Puente Blanco (an old railway bridge)
- Casa Rafols-Iribas, site of Casa de la Cultura Cacique Mabodamaca (non-profit organization dedicated to preserve the culture, the arts and the historical sites of the town of Quebradillas)
- Los Chorritos Pirata Aquatic Park
- The municipal mini golf course

== Economy ==
=== Business ===
A small shopping center called Quebradillas Plaza is located in this municipality.

An event which negatively affected the region in the decade of the 1990s was the disappearance of tax exemptions to the private corporations Section 936 of the code of the US Internal Revenue Service, which at the time was the resulted in the closure of one of the greater manufacturers of textiles in the northwest area of the island. This decline of the industry of the needle occurred similarly in the bordering cities like Isabela and Camuy, generating a regional economic decline as the locals greatly depended on these jobs. In nearby towns like Hatillo, Mayagüez and Aguadilla, the arrival of mega stores and new shopping centers attracted the jobs that used to be in Quebradillas.

The island lacks mass public transportation, people must resort to private cars. The only road to access the important cities, the Puerto Rico Highway 2 suffers from congestion. The town possesses one tunnel that at the beginning of the 20th century was used by steam driven trains that traveled throughout the Island. This absence aggravates the problem of mass transit and the dependence on privately owned vehicles as these are the only method of transportation.

The economy, entering into the 21st century, is based on retail sales. Many small businesses are located along the two main thoroughfares that cross Quebradillas. These consist mainly of light hardware, bakeries, pharmacies, seafood restaurants, American fast food chains and automobile car repair shops.

The town has bank branches for Banco Popular and local savings and credit Unions. These credit unions are most noted for their involvement in common and cultural activities, sponsoring and participating in festivals of typical music such as "Festival of the Gourd in December", sports and educational activities.

== Culture ==
=== Festivals and events ===
Quebradillas celebrates its patron saint festival in October. The Fiestas Patronales de San Rafael Arcangel is a religious and cultural celebration that generally features parades, games, artisans, amusement rides, regional food, and live entertainment.

Other festivals and events celebrated in Quebradillas include:

- Wake of the Three Kings – January
- Kite Festival – February
- Guajataca Carnival – January/February
- Serenade to Mothers – May
- Serenade to Fathers – June
- Quebradillas Cultural Festival – December

=== Sports ===
The town's official basketball team is Los Piratas' who have won a dramatic number of tournaments in the past. Presently the team has made a "comeback" and has won the championship of the island (2013).

- Basketball teams
- Surfing – Guajataca Beach and Puerto Hermina (Pirates Cove)
- Skateboarding – San Jose Skatepark
- Baseball – Los Cocos Park
- Longboarding

== Government ==
The town's government is a small unit with few powers it can execute. Elections are hosted in specific schools every four years to choose a town mayor.

There are several versions detailing different individuals who have served as mayor. An official promotional booklet details 46, while another source states 47. It has also been asserted that a woman, Francisca Lamela de Cordero, served between 1944–1945, in a source that presents 56 incumbents, however she is not included in the municipal-approved list, which expresses that since its founding the town has elected 61 mayors:

#	Mayor	Term start	Term end	Terms	Party
01	Felipe Ruiz	1823		1	None
02	José de Ribera	1824		1	None
03	Francisco Antonio Bravo	1824		1	None
04	Francisco Rodríguez	1825		1	None
05	Juan Antonio Cancela	1828		1	None
06	Pedro Correa	1828		1	None
07	Antonio Comulada (1st term)	1828		1	None
08	Clemente Correa	1829	1832	1	None
09	Antonio J. Porrata	1833		1	None
10	Antonio Comulada (2nd term)	1839		1	None
11	José Bernabé Carranza	1847		1	None
12	José Cesáreo Zeno	1849		1	None
13	Juan de la Cruz Coca	1850		1	None
15	Máximo Ribas	1852		1	None
16	José Ramón Mestre	1853		1	None
17	Lucas Leonides Villalón	1854		1	None
18	Luis Vega de Alicea	1855	1856	1	None
19	Carlos Garavarain	1859	1860	1	None
20	Eduardo Delgado	1867		1	None
21	Carlos González Jiménez	1868		1	None
22	José Perignat y Ochoa	1868		1	None
23	José de Pinguas	1869		1	None
24	José Bernabé Carrazoza	1870	1871	1	None
25	Manuel Lloveras	1871		1	None
27	Francisco G. Condomo	1871	1872	1	None
28	Fernando Ruiz	1872		1	None
29	Nicolás Iglesias	1872	1873	1	None
30	Joaquín Aldea	1873		1	None
33	Manuel Lamela y Valdés (1st term)	1874	1879	1	None
34	Máximo Laborde	1879	1882	1	None
35	Manuel Lamela y Valdés (2nd term)	1882	1884	1	None
36	Felipe Negrón	1884	1890	1	None
37	Nicasio Rodicio (1st term)	1890		1	None
37	José Fidel Hernández (2nd term)	1891		1	None
38	Buenaventura Ocasio	1892		1	None
39	Eusebio de la Torre	1892	1893	1	None
40	José Fidel Hernández (2nd term)	1894		1	None
41	Nicasio Rodicio (2nd term)	1894	1895	1	None
42	José Garriga	1896		1	None
43	Nicasio Rodicio (3rd term)	1896	1898	1	None
44	Honorio Hernández	1898		1	None
45	Francisco Ramón Saavedra	1898		1	None
47	Conrado Santiago	1900		1	None
48	Manuel R. Ríos	1901		1	None
49	Manuel Reyes Ruiz	1902		1	None
50	Santiago Mestre	1904		1	None
51	Honorio Hernández (1st term)	1908		1	None
52	Honorio Hernández (2nd term)	1912	1917	1	None
53	Arcides Ocasio	1917		1	None
54	Manuel Lamela Abreu	1918	1944	1	None
55	José Pérez Soler	1945	1948	1	None
56	Gerardo Pérez Soler	1948	1960	3	None
57	Federico Molinari de Jesús	1960	1964	1	None
58	Gerardo Pérez Soler	1964	1970	1	None
60	Rafael Pérez Santalíz	1970	1992	3	PPD
59	Juan "Johnny" I. Rivera Vargas	1992	1996	1	PPD
60	Luis "El Cano" A. Pérez Reillo	1996	2005	2	PNP
61	Heriberto Vélez Vélez	2005	Incumbent	5	PPD

The city belongs to the Puerto Rico Senatorial district III, which is represented by two Senators. In 2024, Brenda Pérez Soto and Gabriel González, both from the New Progressive Party (PNP), were elected as District Senators.

== Transportation ==
There are 4 bridges in Quebradillas.

== Symbols ==
The municipio has an official flag and coat of arms.

=== Flag ===
It has two red quarters. The red stands for struggle, effort and sacrifice. The other two-quarters have each five green and white wavy stripes, similar to those that appear in the shield.

=== Coat of arms ===
The three waved stripes represent the quebradillas (Spanish for creeks or streams), over the green background of the vegetation. The fish and the walking stick (distinctive of the traveler), are insignias of the angel Saint Raphael, by allusion from the episodes narrated in the Book of Tobias in the Old Testament.

== Education ==
The town features various public and private schools. There is also a public electronic library near Los Chorritos Pirata water park. In 2021 the municipal government opened a child daycare center. Some schools have been remodeled as a result of a government initiative to have "21st century" schools.

=== Schools ===
- Manuel Ramos Hernandez
- Juan Alejo de Arizmendi
- Eugenio Maria De Hostos
- Luis Muñoz Rivera
- Honorio Hernandez
- Pedro Albizu Campos
- Ramon E. Betances
- Ramon Avila Molinari
- Ramon Saavedra
- Jose De Diego

Private schools:

- Colegio San Rafael
- Soles del Jardín
- Pequeños Aprendiendo

== Gallery ==
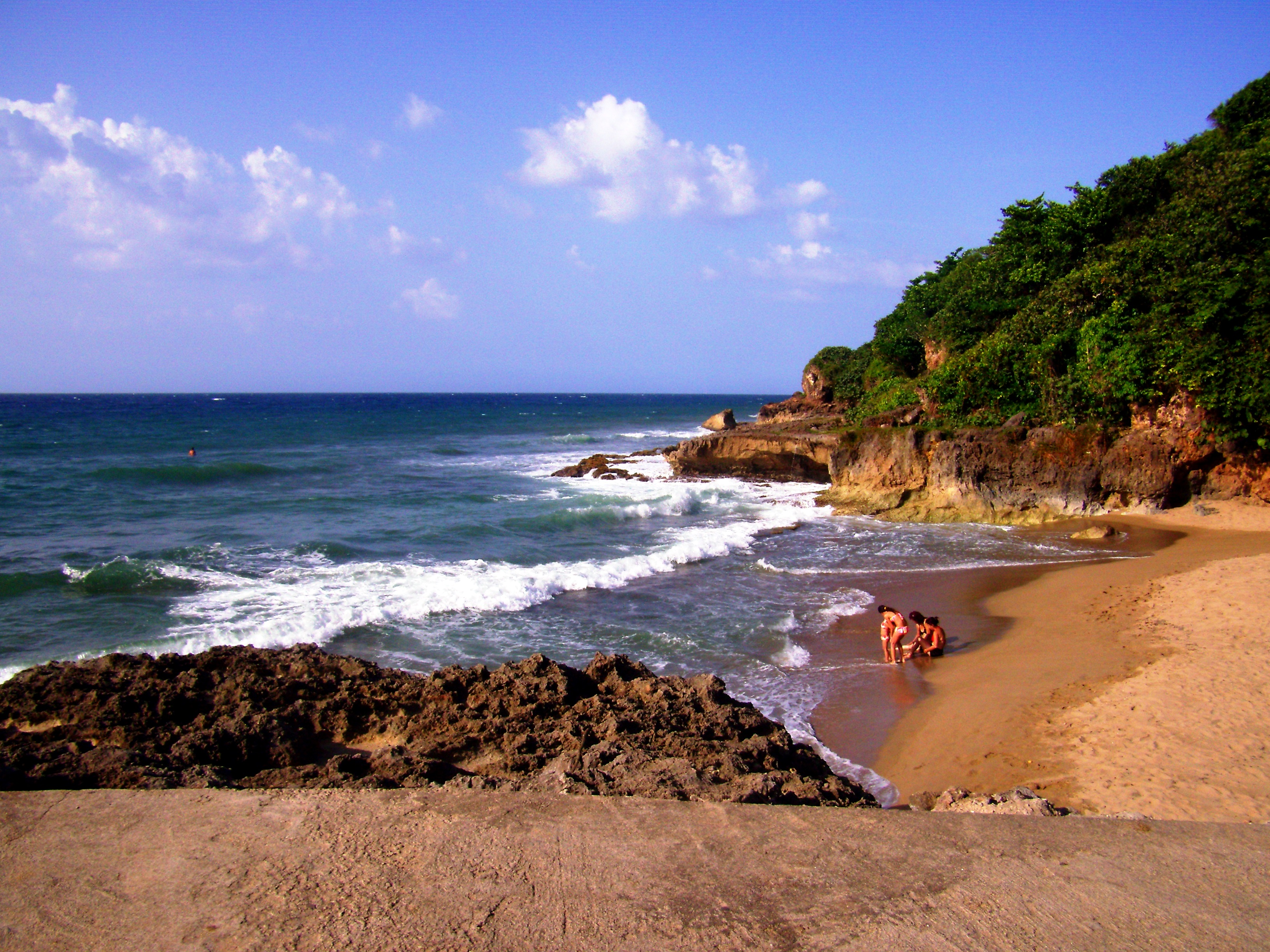
Puerto Hermina beach

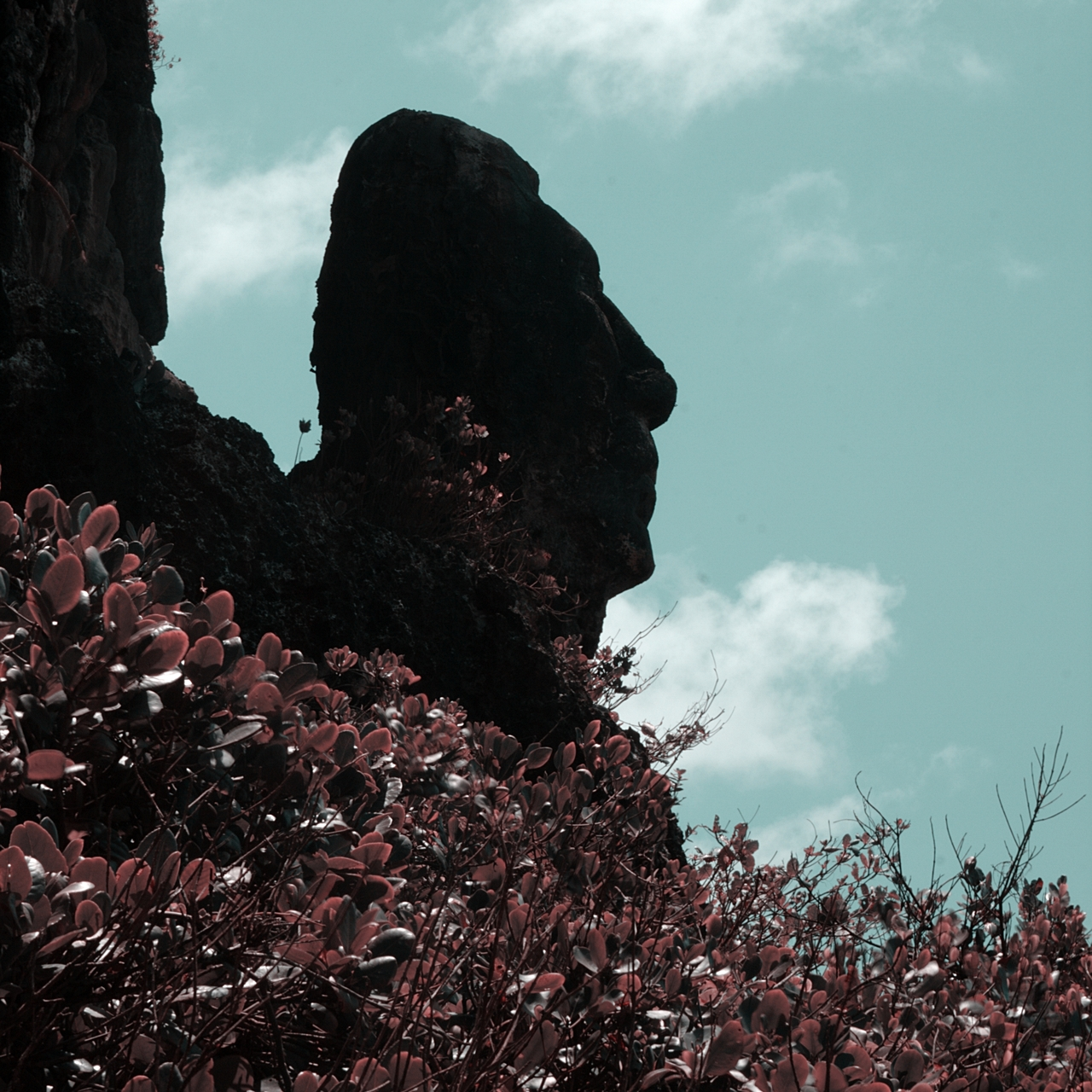
El Indio de Puerto Herminia in Quebradillas

== See also ==
- Quebradillas Limestone—limestone rock formation in area.
- San Juan–Bayamón–Caguas metropolitan area topics
- Did you know—Puerto Rico?
