= Charcas, Quebradillas, Puerto Rico =

Barrio of Puerto Rico

Charcas
- Barrio
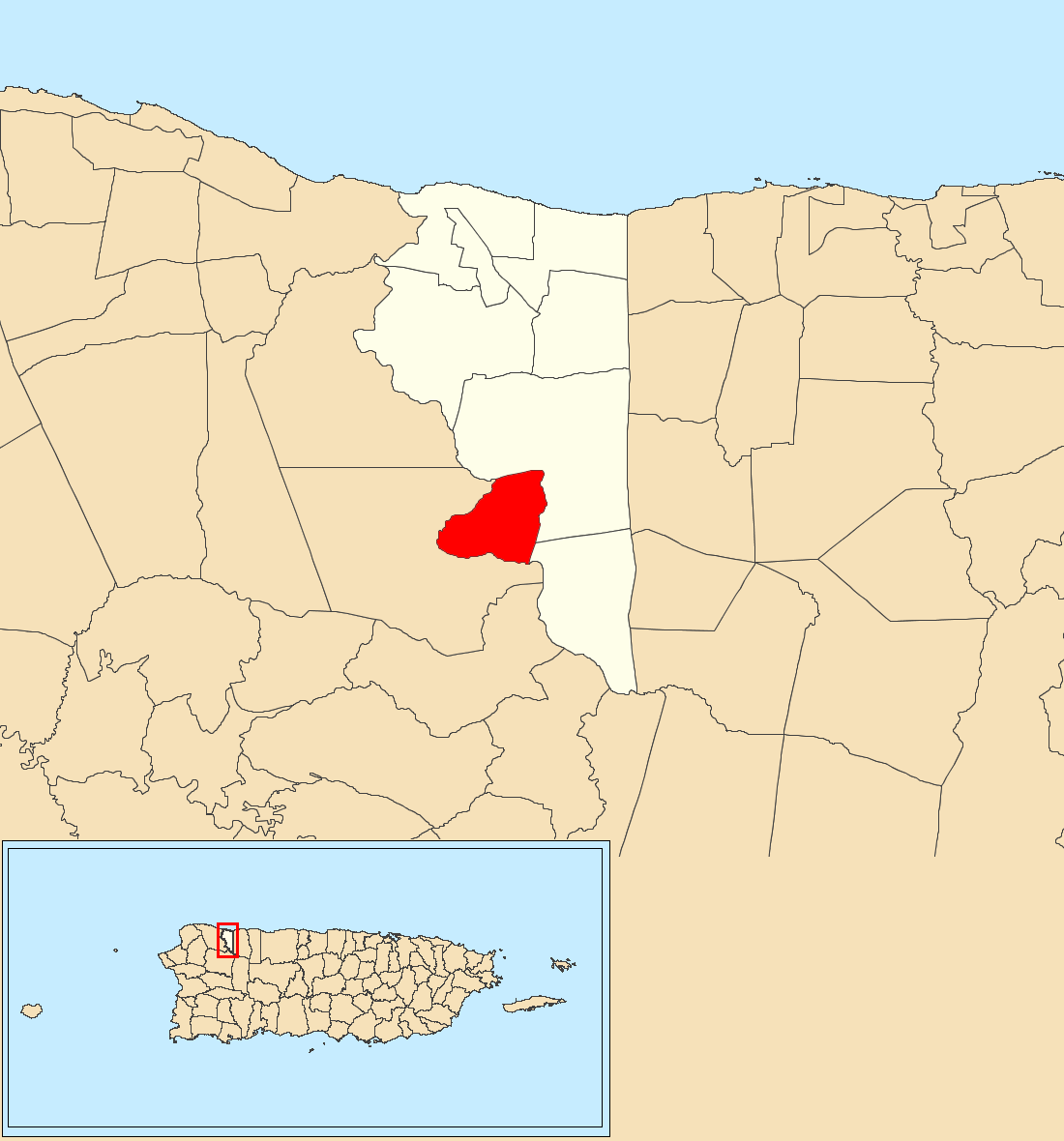
- Location of Charcas within the municipality of Quebradillas shown in red

- Location of Puerto Rico
- Coordinates: 18°24′30″N 66°55′58″W
- Commonwealth: Puerto Rico
- Municipality: Quebradillas

Area
  - Total: 1.77 sq mi (4.6 km^{2})
  - Land: 1.77 sq mi (4.6 km^{2})
  - Water: 0 sq mi (0 km^{2})
- Elevation: 764 ft (233 m)

Population (2010)
  - Total: 401
  - Density: 226.6/sq mi (87.5/km^{2})
- Source: 2010 Census
- Time zone: UTC−4 (AST)
- ZIP Code: 00678
- Area code: 787/939

Charcas is a barrio in the municipality of Quebradillas, Puerto Rico. Its population in 2010 was 401. Charcas is the location of a nostalgic reenactment event Fiesta de Los Jibaros in December which depicts country life before the 1950s.

Historical population
Census	Pop.	Note	%±
1900	330		—
1910	397		20.3%
1920	398		0.3%
1930	454		14.1%
1940	386		−15.0%
1950	312		−19.2%
1960	211		−32.4%
1970	273		29.4%
1980	318		16.5%
1990	407		28.0%
2000	403		−1.0%
2010	401		−0.5%
U.S. Decennial Census; 1899 (shown as 1900) 1910-1930; 1930-1950 1980-2000 2010

== History ==
Charcas was in Spain's gazetteers until Puerto Rico was ceded by Spain in the aftermath of the Spanish–American War under the terms of the Treaty of Paris of 1898 and became an unincorporated territory of the United States. In 1899, the United States Department of War conducted a census of Puerto Rico finding that the population of Charcas barrio was 330.

== Sectors ==
Barrios (which are, in contemporary times, roughly comparable to minor civil divisions) in turn are further subdivided into smaller local populated place areas/units called sectores (sectors in English). The types of sectores may vary, from normally sector to urbanización to reparto to barriada to residencial, among others.

The following sectors are in Charcas barrio:

Carretera 437, Sector El Llano, and Sector Los Muñices.

== See also ==
- List of communities in Puerto Rico
- List of barrios and sectors of Quebradillas, Puerto Rico
