= Yeguada =

Yeguada may refer to:

== Places ==
- Yeguada, Camuy, Puerto Rico, a barrio
- Yeguada, Vega Baja, Puerto Rico, a barrio
