= Zanja, Camuy, Puerto Rico =

Barrio of Puerto Rico

Zanja
- Barrio
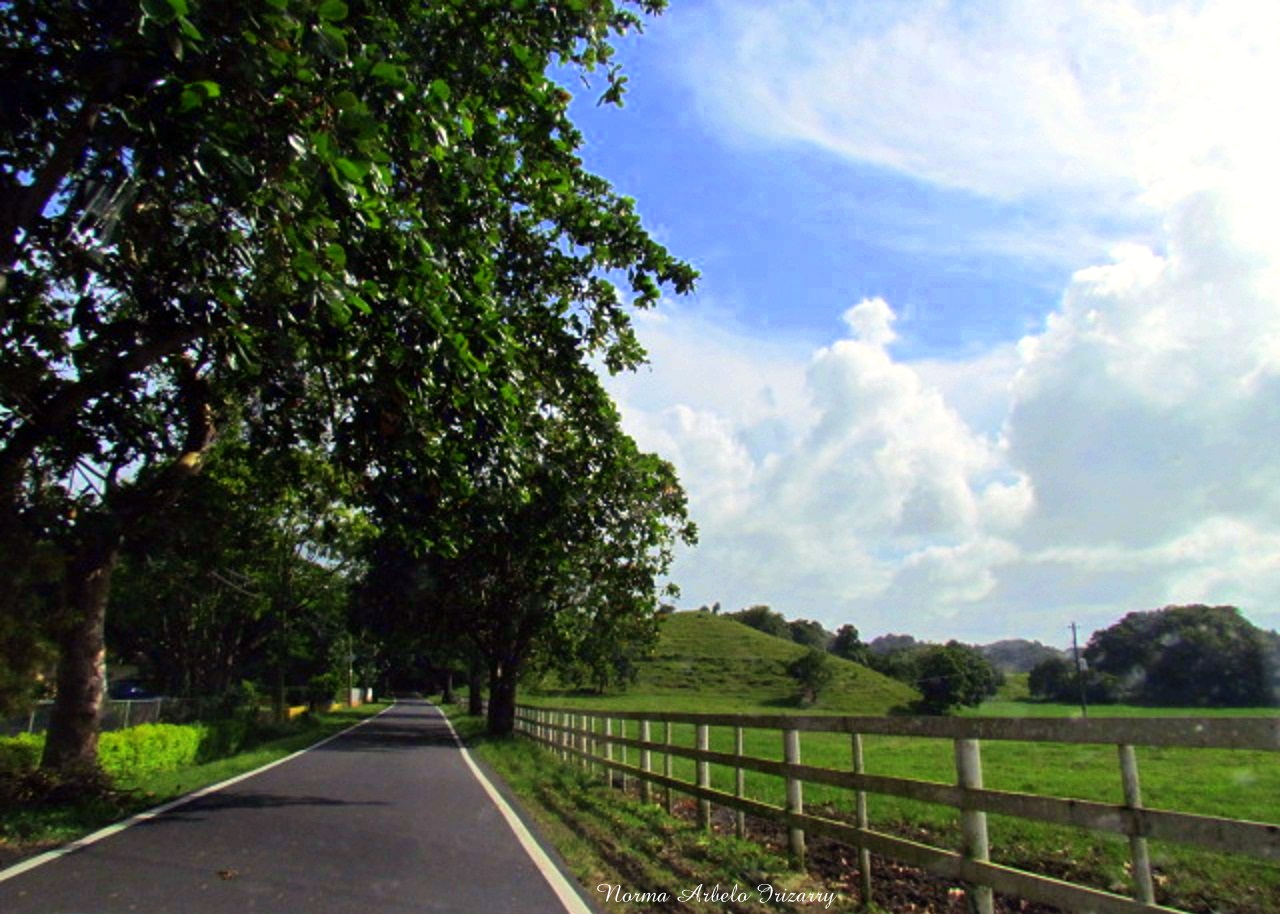
- Small road in Zanja heading towards Abra Honda

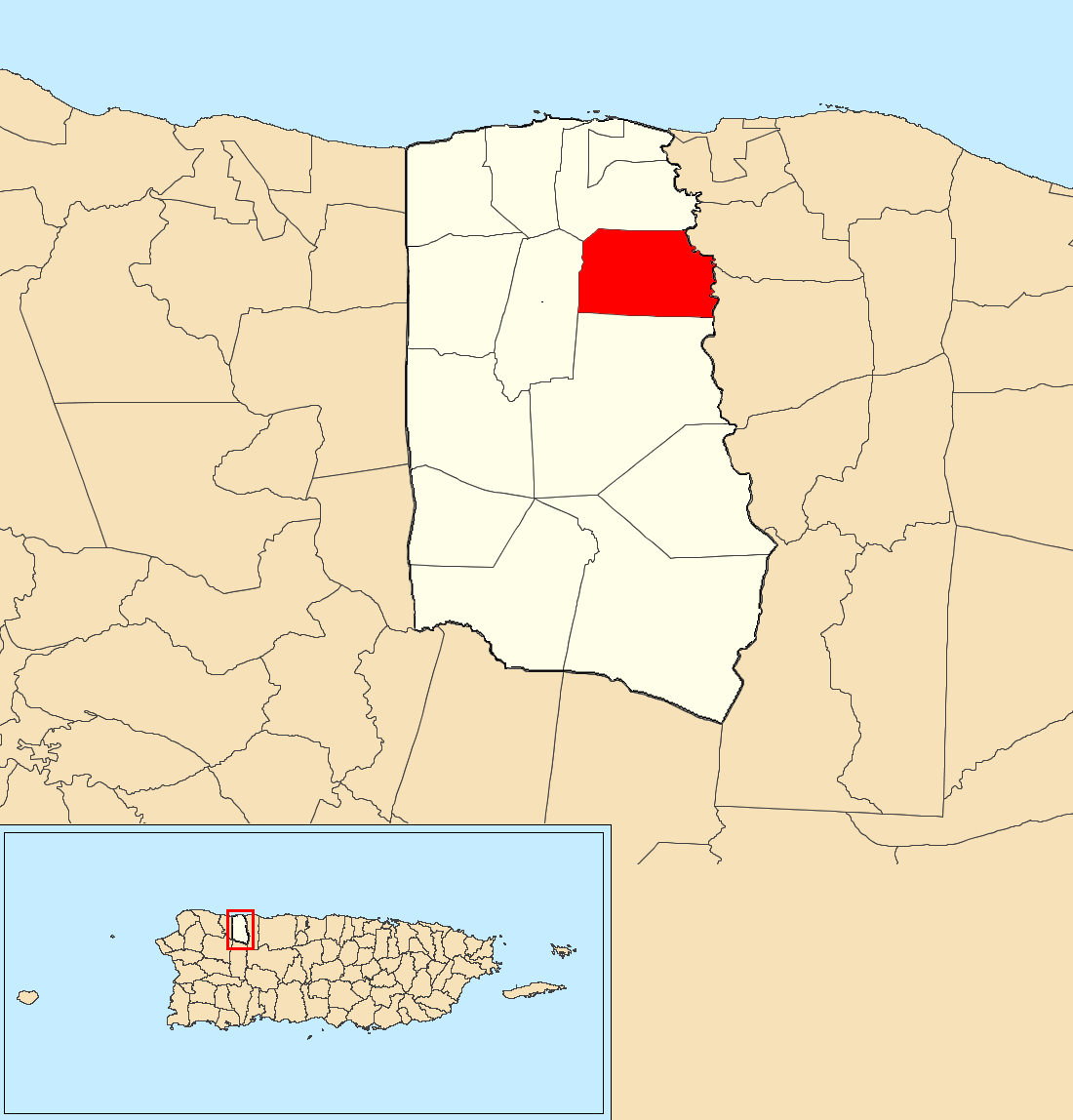
- Location of Zanja within the municipality of Camuy shown in red

- Location of Puerto Rico
- Coordinates: 18°27′10″N 66°50′34″W
- Commonwealth: Puerto Rico
- Municipality: Camuy

Area
  - Total: 2.9 sq mi (7.5 km^{2})
  - Land: 2.9 sq mi (7.5 km^{2})
  - Water: 0 sq mi (0 km^{2})
- Elevation: 322 ft (98 m)

Population (2010)
  - Total: 3,311
  - Density: 1,145.7/sq mi (442.4/km^{2})
- Source: 2010 Census
- Time zone: UTC−4 (AST)

Zanja is a barrio in the municipality of Camuy, Puerto Rico. Its population in 2010 was 3,311.

== History ==
Zanja was in Spain's gazetteers until Puerto Rico was ceded by Spain in the aftermath of the Spanish–American War under the terms of the Treaty of Paris of 1898 and became an unincorporated territory of the United States. In 1899, the United States Department of War conducted a census of Puerto Rico finding that the population of Zanja barrio was 833.

Historical population
Census	Pop.	Note	%±
1900	833		—
1910	918		10.2%
1920	1,140		24.2%
1930	1,243		9.0%
1940	1,305		5.0%
1950	1,728		32.4%
1960	1,926		11.5%
1970	2,023		5.0%
1980	2,461		21.7%
1990	2,793		13.5%
2000	3,080		10.3%
2010	3,311		7.5%
U.S. Decennial Census; 1899 (shown as 1900) 1910-1930; 1930-1950 1980-2000 2010

== See also ==
- List of communities in Puerto Rico
