= Veiga =

Veiga (meaning meadow in Portuguese and Galician) may be used as a place name or surname. It may refer to:

- A Veiga, a municipality in Galicia, Spain
- As Veigas, a parish in Asturias, Spain
- A Veiga or Vegadeo, a municipality in Asturias, Spain
- Veiga (surname), list of people with the surname
- Rádio Mayrink Veiga, a radio station in Rio de Janeiro, Brazil
- Universidade Veiga de Almeida, a university in Brazil

== See also ==
- Vega, Spanish variant
