= Vega (name) =

Vega (pronounced [ˈbeɣa]) is a Spanish surname that means "dweller in the meadow", or "one who lives on the plain". Other versions of the surname Vega are Vegas or Vegaz. The name sometimes refers to "Virgin of the Meadow", derived from a title of the Virgin Mary. It is also sometimes given in reference to a star in the constellation Lyra.

== Personal name ==
- Vega Tamotia (born 1985), Indian actress and producer

== Geographical distribution of the surname ==
As of 2014, 25.9% of all known bearers of the surname Vega were residents of Mexico (frequency 1:425), 9.6% of Colombia (1:442), 9.2% of the United States (1:3,476), 8.8% of Argentina (1:432), 7.9% of Peru (1:356), 6.0% of Spain (1:685), 5.7% of Chile (1:272), 3.9% of Puerto Rico (1:80), 3.5% of Cuba (1:294), 3.1% of Ecuador (1:454), 3.0% of Costa Rica (1:141), 2.0% of Panama (1:178), 1.7% of the Philippines (1:5,213), 1.6% of Paraguay (1:403), 1.5% of Venezuela (1:1,777), 1.4% of Bolivia (1:686) and 1.2% of Nicaragua (1:454).

In Spain, the frequency of the surname was higher than national average (1:685) in the following autonomous communities:

1. Canary Islands (1:216)
2. Asturias (1:221)
3. Cantabria (1:335)
4. Castile and León (1:381)
5. Ceuta (1:473)
6. Andalusia (1:510)
7. Extremadura (1:557)

In Puerto Rico, the frequency of the surname was higher than national average (1:80) in the following municipalities:

1. Quebradillas (1:6)
2. Coamo (1:10)
3. Corozal (1:11)
4. Naranjito (1:11)
5. Comerío (1:12)
6. Aibonito (1:14)
7. Barranquitas (1:14)
8. Maunabo (1:14)
9. Santa Isabel (1:15)
10. Orocovis (1:15)
11. Salinas (1:17)
12. Guayama (1:19)
13. Patillas (1:20)
14. Arroyo (1:21)
15. Isabela (1:37)
16. Camuy (1:44)
17. Hormigueros (1:66)
18. Sabana Grande (1:73)
19. Florida (1:78)
20. Rincón (1:78)
21. Mayagüez (1:79)

== Surname ==
- Alan Vega (1938–2016), American singer and visual artist
- Alexa PenaVega (née Vega; born 1988), Colombian-American actress and singer
- Amelia Vega (born 1984), Miss Universe 2003 from the Dominican Republic
- Cecilia Vega (born 1977), American journalist, correspondent and anchor for ABC News
- Charlotte Vega (born 1994), Spanish actress
- Conrado Vega (1938–2010), American politician and educator
- Danielle Vega (born 1986), American actress
- Daphne Rubin-Vega (née Vega; born 1969), Panamanian actress.
- Edgardo Vega Yunqué (1936–2008), Puerto Rican novelist, also known as Ed Vega
- Hugo Gutiérrez Vega (1934–2015), Mexican poet, lawyer, writer, academic, actor and translator
- Janine Pommy Vega (1942–2010), American poet
- José Antonio Rodríguez Vega (1957–2002), Spanish serial killer
- Judah Vega, 17th century rabbi in Amsterdam
- Julie Vega, stage name of Filipino singer and actress Julie Pearl Apostol Postigo (1968–1985)
- Jurij Vega (1754–1802), Slovene mathematician, physicist and artillery officer
- Karen Vega (born 2001), Oaxaqueñan Mexican fashion model
- Lope de Vega (1562–1635), Spanish playwright
- Little Louie Vega (born 1965), American DJ, record producer and mixer
- Luis Vega (mathematician) (born 1960), Spanish mathematician
- Luis Vega Ramos (born 1965), Puerto Rican lawyer and politician
- Lydia de Vega (1964–2022), Filipino athlete at the 1984 and 1988 Olympics
- Makenzie Vega (born 1994), American actress
- Manuel Montalba Vega (1906–1975), Chilean politician
- Marcelo Vega (footballer, born 1971), Chilean footballer
- Maria Vega (1898–1980), Russian poet, artist and translator
- Mariana Vega (born 1985), Venezuelan singer-songwriter
- Marina Vega (1923–2011), Spanish spy for the French Resistance
- Óscar Vega (boxer) (born 1965), Spanish boxer at the 1992 Olympics
- Patricia Vega Herrera (born 1963), Costa Rican lawyer and politician
- Paulina Vega (born 1993), Colombian television host, beauty pageant title holder, Miss Universe 2014
- Paz Vega (born 1976), Spanish actress
- Silverio Vega (born 1956), Mayor of West New York, New Jersey
- Suzanne Vega (born 1959), American songwriter and singer (stepdaughter of Edgardo)
- Tanzina Vega, American journalist
- Táta Vega (born 1951), American vocalist
- Tim Vega (1965–2002), American graphic designer (son of Edgardo)
- Vicente Vega (1955–2025), Venezuelan footballer
- Vicky Vega (born 1966), Filipino politician and actress

== Fictional characters ==
- Luciana Vega from American Girl
- Tori Vega from Victorious
- Trina Vega from Victorious
- Vincent Vega from Pulp Fiction
- Victor “Mr. Blonde” Vega from Reservoir Dogs
- Vega from Street Fighter
- Usnavi de la Vega from In the Heights
- James Vega from Mass Effect 3
- Tommy Vega from 9-1-1: Lone Star

== See also ==
- Veiga (disambiguation), Portuguese variant
- De la Vega (disambiguation), Spanish variant
