= Cibao, Camuy, Puerto Rico =

Barrio of Puerto Rico

Cibao
- Barrio
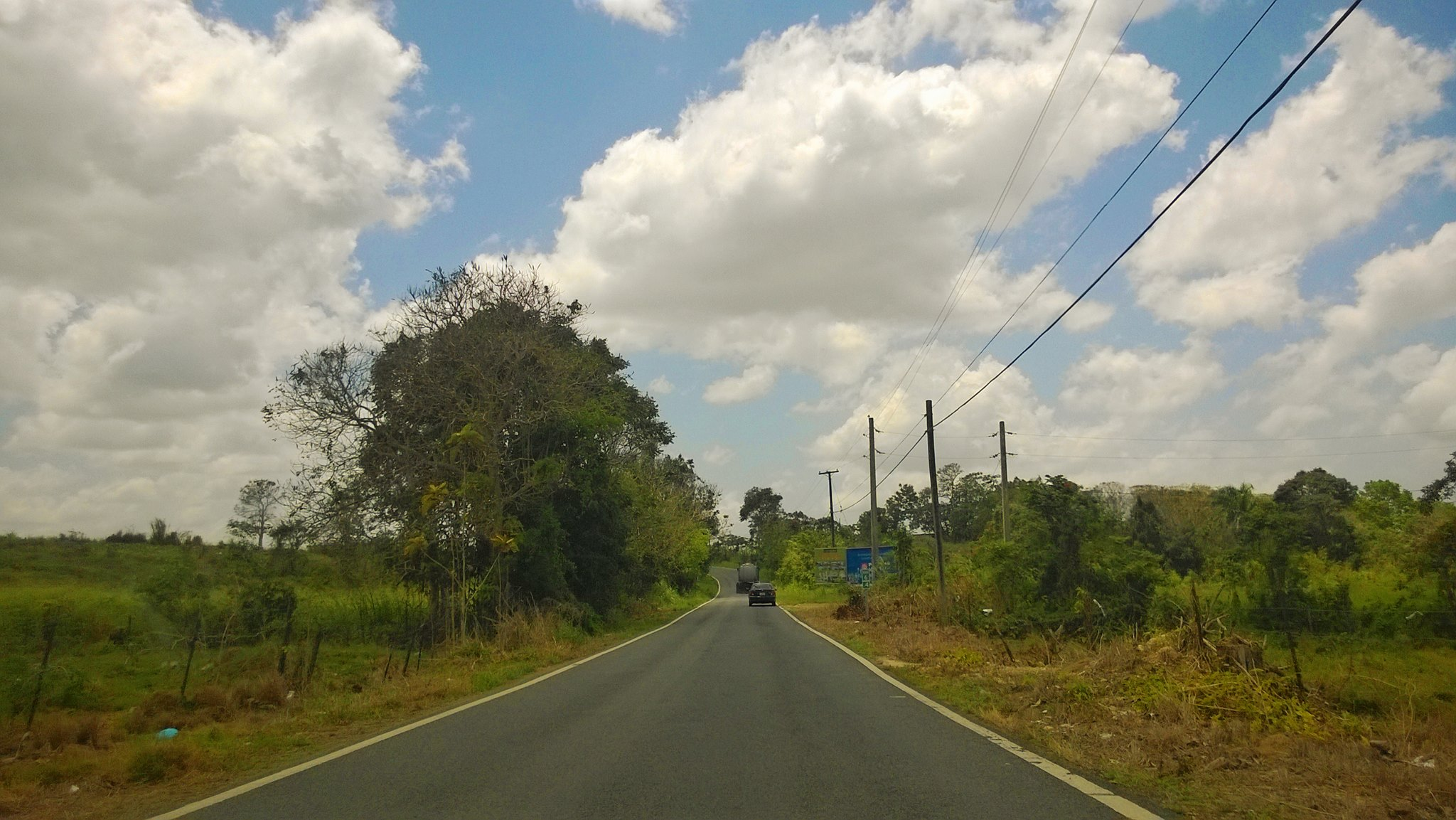
- Puerto Rico Highway 455 in Cibao

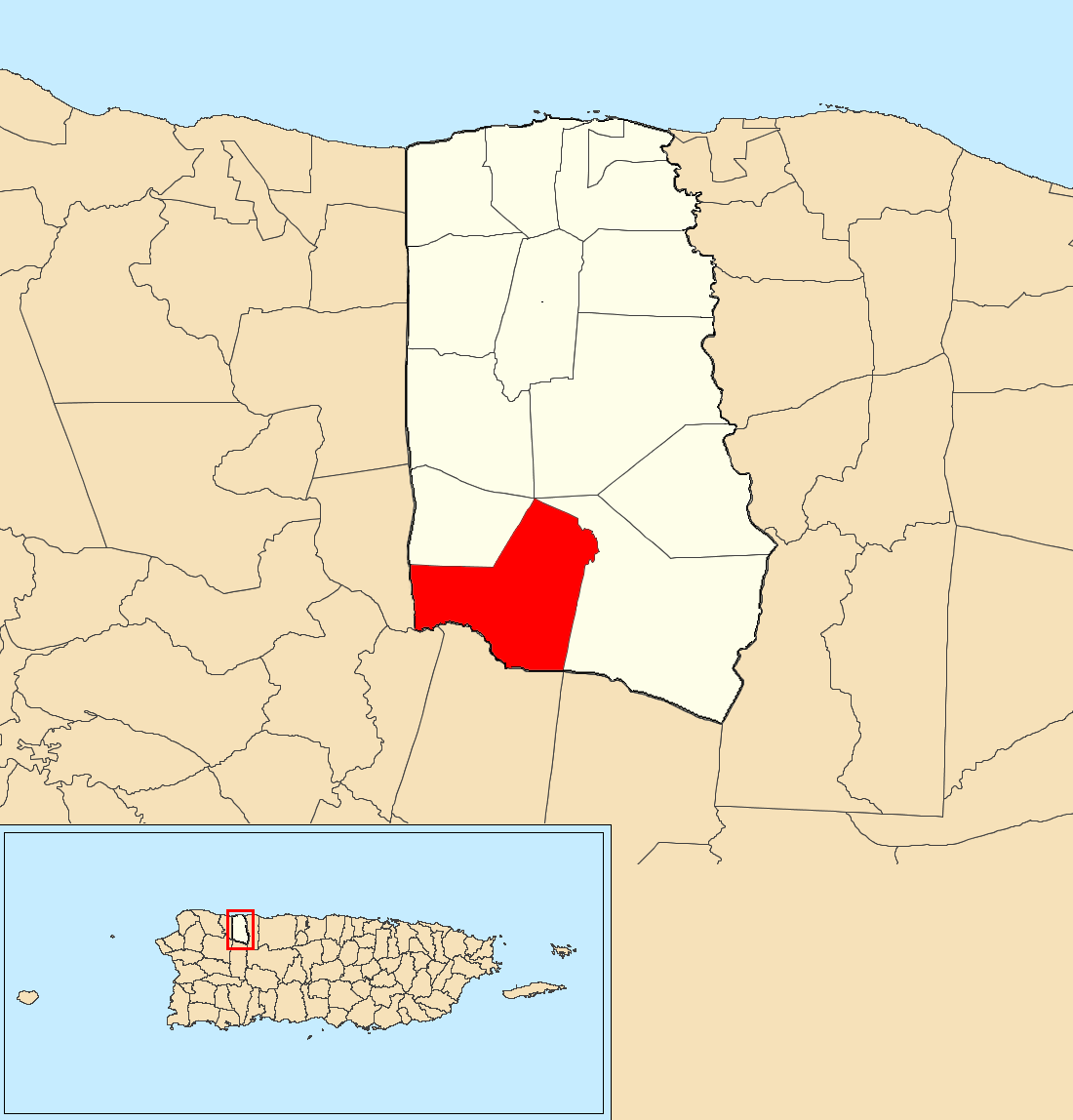
- Location of Cibao within the municipality of Camuy shown in red

- Location of Puerto Rico
- Coordinates: 18°22′40″N 66°52′26″W
- Commonwealth: Puerto Rico
- Municipality: Camuy

Area
  - Total: 4.84 sq mi (12.5 km^{2})
  - Land: 4.84 sq mi (12.5 km^{2})
  - Water: 0.00 sq mi (0 km^{2})
- Elevation: 942 ft (287 m)

Population (2010)
  - Total: 1,374
  - Density: 284.5/sq mi (109.8/km^{2})
- Source: 2010 Census
- Time zone: UTC−4 (AST)

Cibao is a barrio in the municipality of Camuy, Puerto Rico. Its population in 2010 was 1,374.

== History ==
Cibao was in Spain's gazetteers until Puerto Rico was ceded by Spain in the aftermath of the Spanish–American War under the terms of the Treaty of Paris of 1898 and became an unincorporated territory of the United States. In 1899, the United States Department of War conducted a census of Puerto Rico finding that the population of Cibao barrio was 695.

Historical population
Census	Pop.	Note	%±
1900	695		—
1910	719		3.5%
1920	1,077		49.8%
1930	1,246		15.7%
1940	1,372		10.1%
1950	1,376		0.3%
1960	1,156		−16.0%
1970	906		−21.6%
1980	1,068		17.9%
1990	1,156		8.2%
2000	1,314		13.7%
2010	1,374		4.6%
U.S. Decennial Census; 1899 (shown as 1900) 1910-1930; 1930-1950 1980-2000 2010

== See also ==
- List of communities in Puerto Rico
