= Puertos, Camuy, Puerto Rico =

Barrio of Camuy, Puerto Rico

Puertos
- Barrio
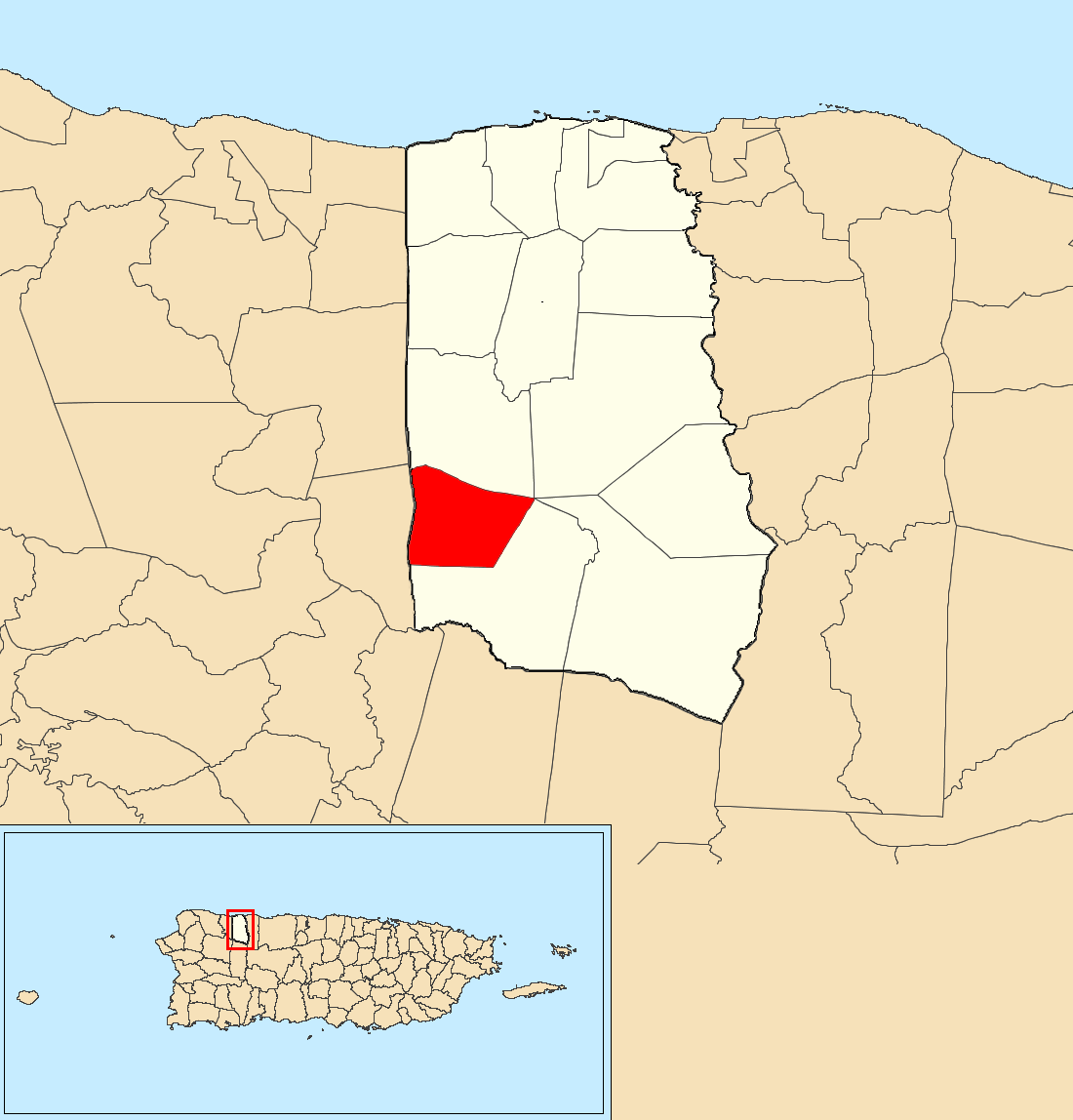
- Location of Puertos within the municipality of Camuy shown in red

- Location of Puerto Rico
- Coordinates: 18°23′23″N 66°52′50″W
- Commonwealth: Puerto Rico
- Municipality: Camuy

Area
  - Total: 2.4 sq mi (6.2 km^{2})
  - Land: 2.4 sq mi (6.2 km^{2})
  - Water: 0 sq mi (0 km^{2})
- Elevation: 968 ft (295 m)

Population (2010)
  - Total: 1,330
  - Density: 556.5/sq mi (214.9/km^{2})
- Source: 2010 Census
- Time zone: UTC−4 (AST)

Puertos Barrio is a barrio in the municipality of Camuy, Puerto Rico. Its population in 2010 was 1330.

== History ==
Puertos was in Spain's gazetteers until Puerto Rico was ceded by Spain in the aftermath of the Spanish–American War under the terms of the Treaty of Paris of 1898 and became an unincorporated territory of the United States. In 1899, the United States Department of War conducted a census of Puerto Rico finding that the population of Puertos barrio was 419.

Historical population
Census	Pop.	Note	%±
1900	419		—
1910	452		7.9%
1920	716		58.4%
1930	827		15.5%
1940	961		16.2%
1950	1,018		5.9%
1960	1,268		24.6%
1970	1,020		−19.6%
1980	1,307		28.1%
1990	1,379		5.5%
2000	1,545		12.0%
2010	1,330		−13.9%
U.S. Decennial Census; 1899 (shown as 1900) 1910-1930; 1930-1950 1980-2000 2010

== See also ==
- List of communities in Puerto Rico
