= Santiago, Camuy, Puerto Rico =

Barrio of Puerto Rico

Santiago
- Barrio
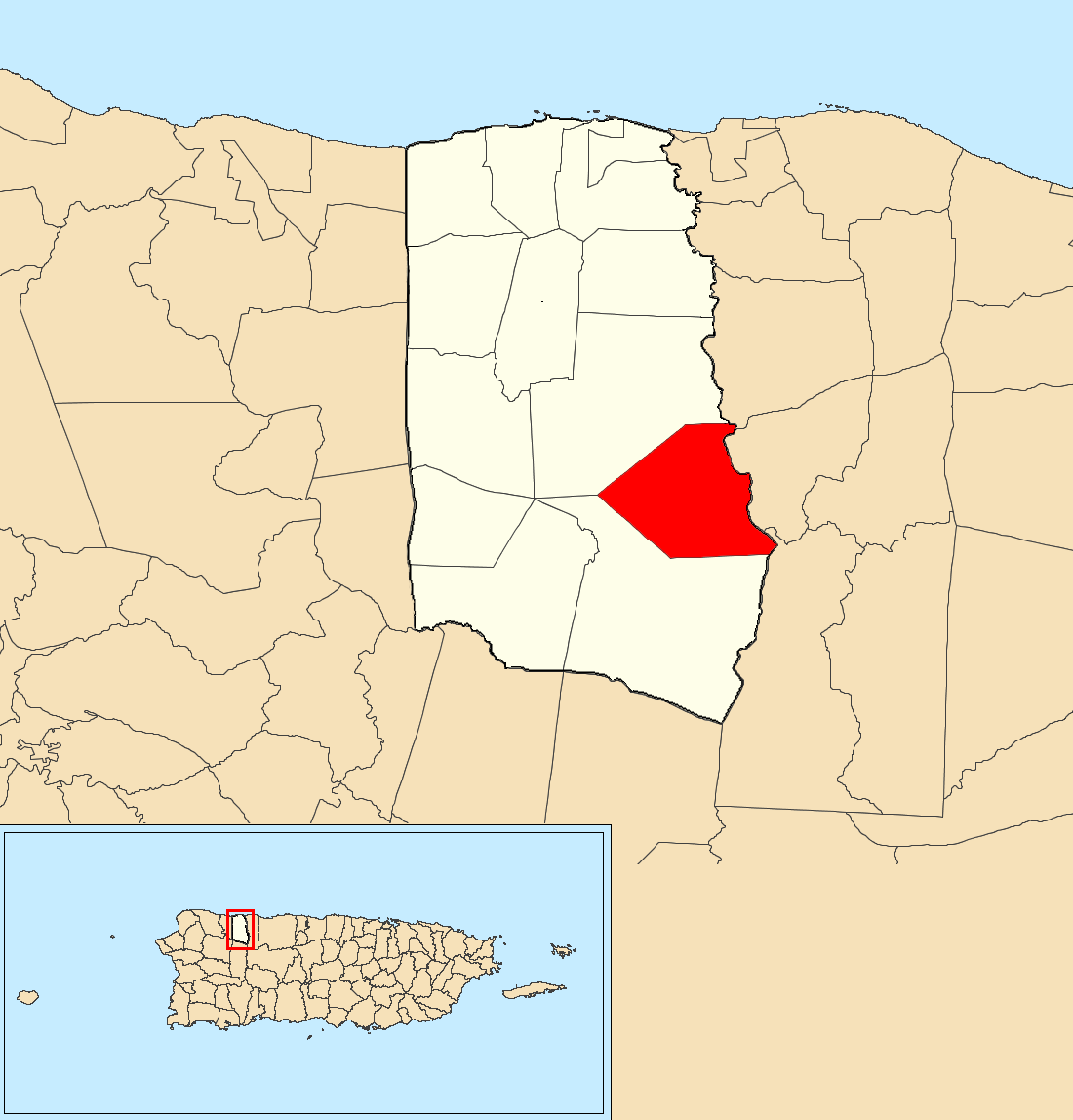
- Location of Santiago within the municipality of Camuy shown in red

- Location of Puerto Rico
- Coordinates: 18°23′35″N 66°49′55″W
- Commonwealth: Puerto Rico
- Municipality: Camuy

Area
  - Total: 3.88 sq mi (10.0 km^{2})
  - Land: 3.88 sq mi (10.0 km^{2})
  - Water: 0 sq mi (0 km^{2})
- Elevation: 758 ft (231 m)

Population (2010)
  - Total: 428
  - Density: 110.3/sq mi (42.6/km^{2})
- Source: 2010 Census
- Time zone: UTC−4 (AST)

Santiago (pronounced [sanˈtjaɣo]) is a barrio in the municipality of Camuy, Puerto Rico. Its population in 2010 was 428.

== History ==
Santiago was in Spain's gazetteers until Puerto Rico was ceded by Spain in the aftermath of the Spanish–American War under the terms of the Treaty of Paris of 1898 and became an unincorporated territory of the United States. In 1899, the United States Department of War conducted a census of Puerto Rico finding that the population of Santiago barrio was 657.

Historical population
Census	Pop.	Note	%±
1900	657		—
1910	631		−4.0%
1920	788		24.9%
1930	670		−15.0%
1940	615		−8.2%
1950	638		3.7%
1960	489		−23.4%
1970	428		−12.5%
1980	310		−27.6%
1990	425		37.1%
2000	490		15.3%
2010	428		−12.7%
U.S. Decennial Census; 1899 (shown as 1900) 1910-1930; 1930-1950 1980-2000 2010

== See also ==
- List of communities in Puerto Rico
