= Membrillo, Camuy, Puerto Rico =

Barrio of Puerto Rico

Membrillo
- Barrio
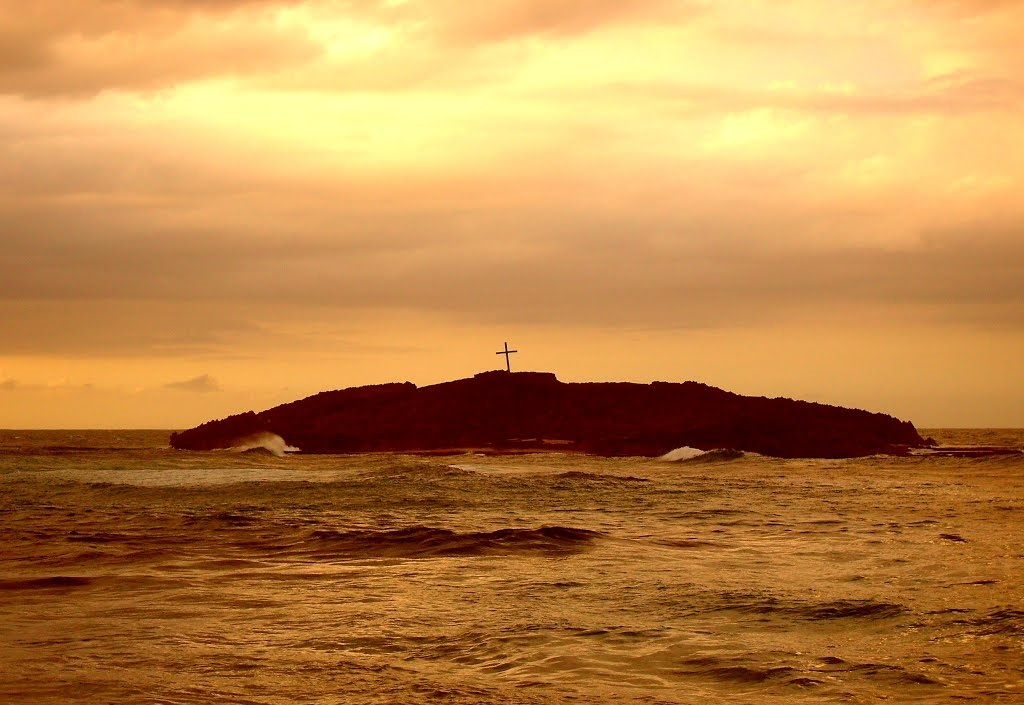
- View of Peñon de Afuera, a cay off Membrillo

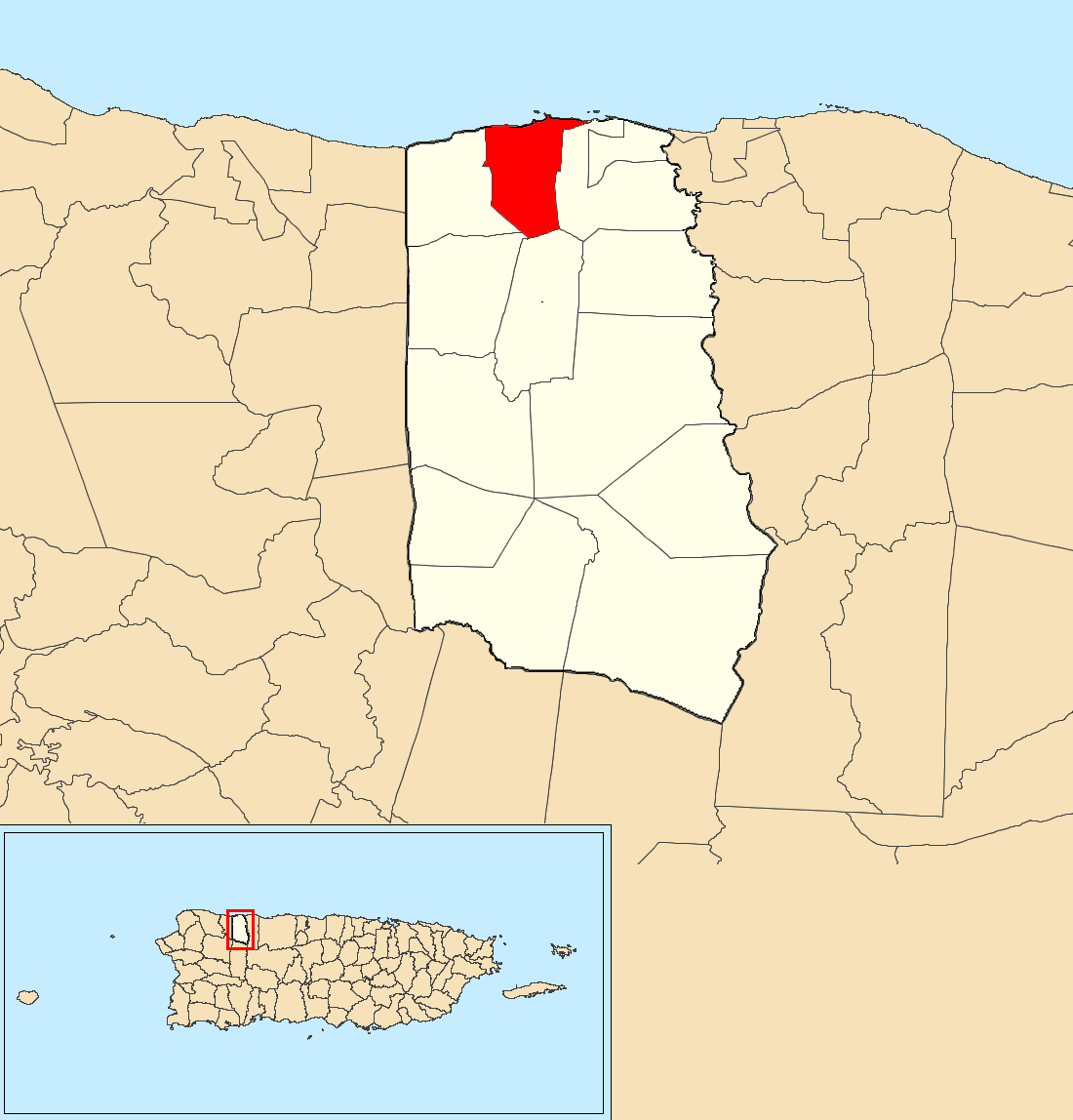
- Location of Membrillo within the municipality of Camuy shown in red

- Location of Puerto Rico
- Coordinates: 18°29′04″N 66°52′00″W
- Commonwealth: Puerto Rico
- Municipality: Camuy

Area
  - Total: 2.61 sq mi (6.8 km^{2})
  - Land: 1.99 sq mi (5.2 km^{2})
  - Water: 0.62 sq mi (1.6 km^{2})
- Elevation: 85 ft (26 m)

Population (2010)
  - Total: 3,459
  - Density: 1,738.2/sq mi (671.1/km^{2})
- Source: 2010 Census
- Time zone: UTC−4 (AST)

Membrillo is a barrio in the municipality of Camuy, Puerto Rico. Its population in 2010 was 3,459.

== History ==
Membrillo was in Spain's gazetteers until Puerto Rico was ceded by Spain in the aftermath of the Spanish–American War under the terms of the Treaty of Paris of 1898 and became an unincorporated territory of the United States. In 1899, the United States Department of War conducted a census of Puerto Rico finding that the population of Membrillo barrio was 769.

Historical population
Census	Pop.	Note	%±
1900	769		—
1910	781		1.6%
1920	824		5.5%
1930	981		19.1%
1940	1,036		5.6%
1950	1,090		5.2%
1960	1,166		7.0%
1970	1,274		9.3%
1980	1,542		21.0%
1990	2,305		49.5%
2000	3,415		48.2%
2010	3,459		1.3%
U.S. Decennial Census; 1899 (shown as 1900) 1910-1930; 1930-1950 1980-2000 2010

== Sectors ==
Barrios (which are roughly comparable to minor civil divisions) in turn are further subdivided into smaller local populated place areas/units called sectores (sectors in English). The types of sectores may vary, from normally sector to urbanización to reparto to barriada to residencial, among others.

== Gallery ==
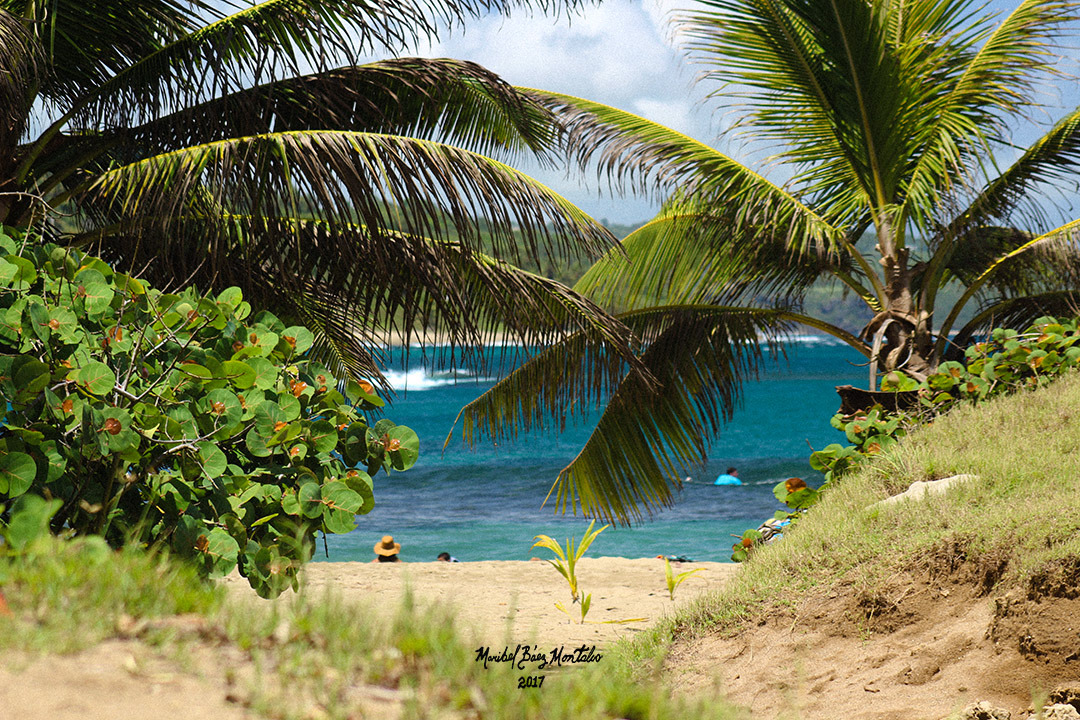
View of beach at Villa Pesquera in Membrillo

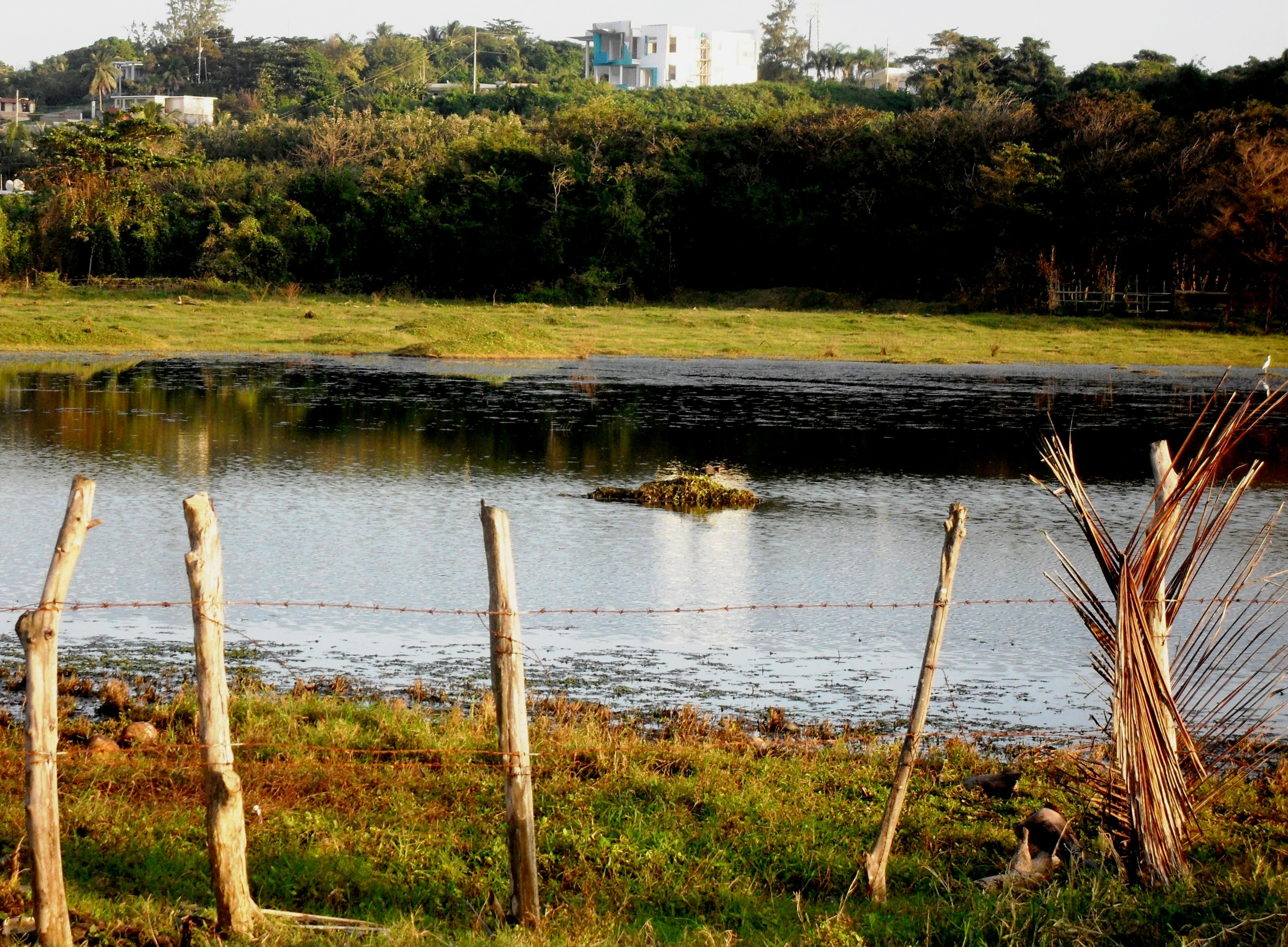
Membrillo Bajura Sector

== See also ==
- List of communities in Puerto Rico
