= Camuy Arriba, Camuy, Puerto Rico =

Barrio of Puerto Rico

Camuy Arriba
- Barrio
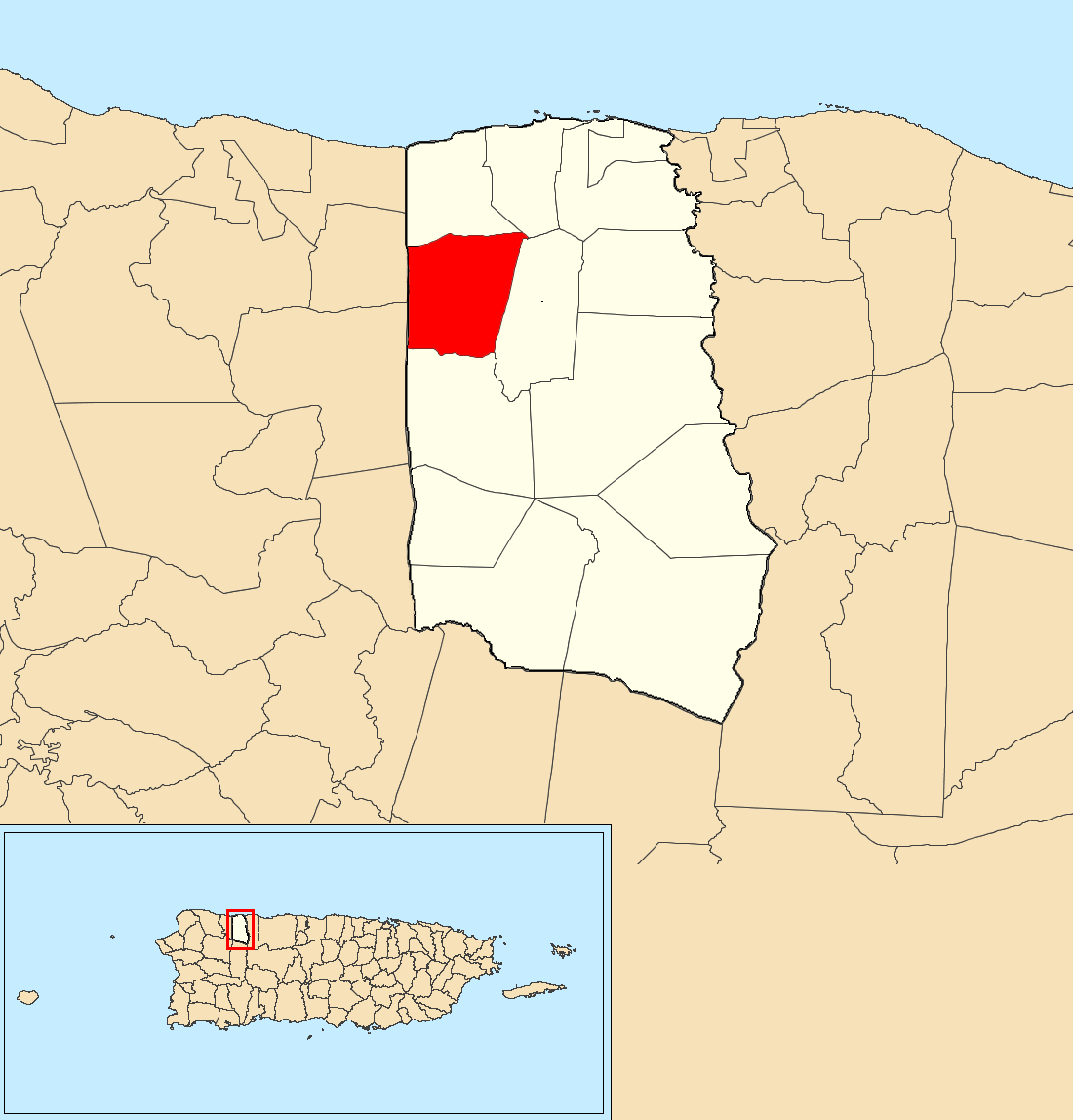
- Location of Camuy Arriba within the municipality of Camuy shown in red

- Location of Puerto Rico
- Coordinates: 18°26′44″N 66°53′03″W
- Commonwealth: Puerto Rico
- Municipality: Camuy

Area
  - Total: 3.15 sq mi (8.2 km^{2})
  - Land: 3.15 sq mi (8.2 km^{2})
  - Water: 0.00 sq mi (0 km^{2})
- Elevation: 433 ft (132 m)

Population (2010)
  - Total: 3,290
  - Density: 1,044.4/sq mi (403.2/km^{2})
- Source: 2010 Census
- Time zone: UTC−4 (AST)

Camuy Arriba is a barrio in the municipality of Camuy, Puerto Rico. Its population in 2010 was 3,290.

== History ==
Camuy Arriba was in Spain's gazetteers until Puerto Rico was ceded by Spain in the aftermath of the Spanish–American War under the terms of the Treaty of Paris of 1898 and became an unincorporated territory of the United States. In 1899, the United States Department of War conducted a census of Puerto Rico finding that the population of Camuy Arriba barrio was 774.

Historical population
Census	Pop.	Note	%±
1900	774		—
1910	789		1.9%
1920	960		21.7%
1930	1,050		9.4%
1940	1,225		16.7%
1950	1,653		34.9%
1960	1,565		−5.3%
1970	1,255		−19.8%
1980	2,047		63.1%
1990	2,490		21.6%
2000	3,134		25.9%
2010	3,290		5.0%
U.S. Decennial Census; 1899 (shown as 1900) 1910-1930; 1930-1950 1980-2000 2010

== See also ==
- List of communities in Puerto Rico
