= Ernesto Memorial Chapel =

Historic place in Camuy, Puerto Rico

- U.S. National Register of Historic Places
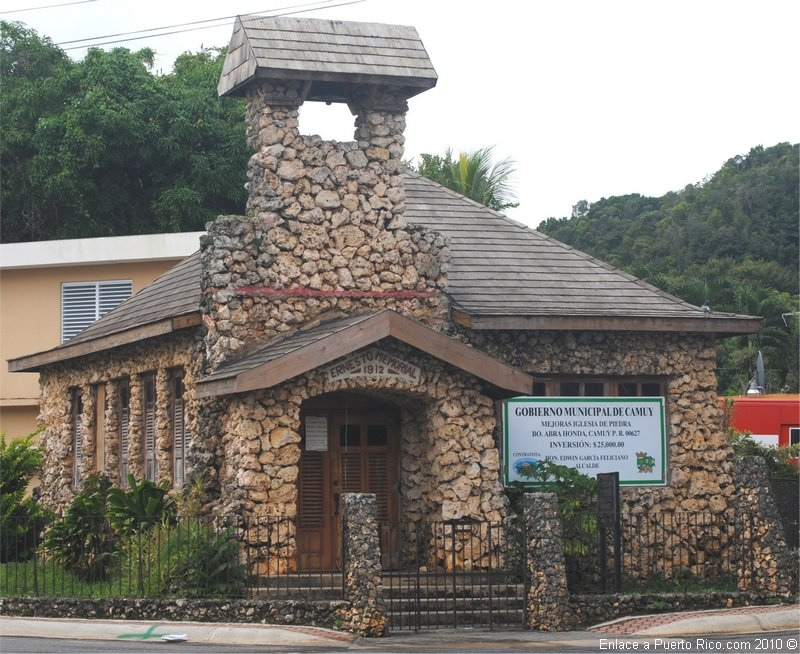
- Ernesto Memorial Chapel

- Location within Puerto Rico
- Nearest city: Camuy, Puerto Rico
- Coordinates: 18°25′59″N 66°51′17″W
- Area: less than one acre
- Built: 1912
- Architect: Munson, Albert
- Architectural style: Bungalow/craftsman
- NRHP reference No.: 10000453
- Added to NRHP: July 8, 2010

The Ernesto Memorial Chapel, also known as the Iglesia de Piedra (Stone Church) and the Iglesia Metodista de Piedra (Methodist Stone Church) is located in Abra Honda, a rural barrio in Camuy, Puerto Rico. After the Kiplinger family lost their 21-year-old son, Ernesto, they donated money for the building of the church.

The unique, stone chapel was designed by architect Albert Munson in a Craftsman style. The church took five years to build and was completed in 1912. The chapel measures about eighty square meters and has a pitched, wooden roof. Its most striking element is that it's made of limestone stones, and built by hand.

Except for around the windows, the mortar used as an adhesive between the stones is practically imperceptible, creating the impression that the stones are supported by their own geometric tie and weight. The building lacks a foundation. The main facade of the building is dominated by an impressive portico on which the belfry is supported. It houses the original bell of 1912. The property was added to the National Register of Historic Places on July 8, 2010.

== See also ==
- National Register of Historic Places listings in Camuy, Puerto Rico
