= Veiga (surname) =

Veiga is a Galician and Portuguese surname. Notable people with the name include:

- Alonso Pita da Veiga (died 1554), Spanish nobleman and military officer, famous for his deeds at the 1525 Battle of Pavia
- Amélia Veiga (born 1931), Portuguese-born Angolan poet and teacher
- António da Mota Veiga (1915–2005), Portuguese politician
- Argemiro Veiga (born 1972), Brazilian football player
- Bruno Veiga (born 1990), Brazilian football player
- Carlos Veiga (born 1949), second (and first democratically elected) Prime Minister of Cape Verde
- Danilo Veiga (born 2002), Portuguese football player
- Eric Veiga (born 1997), Luxembourgish football player
- Estácio da Veiga (1828–1891), Portuguese archeologist and write
- Evelise Veiga (born 1996), Portuguese athlete
- Francisco da Veiga Beirão (1841–1916), Portuguese politician
- Gabri Veiga (born 2002), Spanish football player
- Jennifer Veiga (born 1962), American attorney and politician
- José Veiga (disambiguation), multiple people
- Justino Veiga, São Tomé and Príncipean politician
- Lourenço da Veiga, Portugal-born professional race car driver
- Mafalda Veiga (born 1965), Portuguese singer-songwriter
- Manuel Veiga, multiple people
- Marcelo Veiga (1964–2020), Brazilian football player and manager
- Martin Veiga (born 1970), Galician academic, poet, translator and critic
- Nélson Veiga (born 1978), Cape Verdean football player
- Raphael Veiga (born 1995), Brazilian football player
- Renato Veiga (born 2003), Portuguese football player
- Susana Veiga (born 2000), Portuguese Paralympic swimmer
- Unai Veiga (born 1998), Spanish football player
- Uriel da Veiga (born 1940), Brazilian football player
