= Ciénagas, Camuy, Puerto Rico =

Barrio of Puerto Rico

Ciénagas
- Barrio
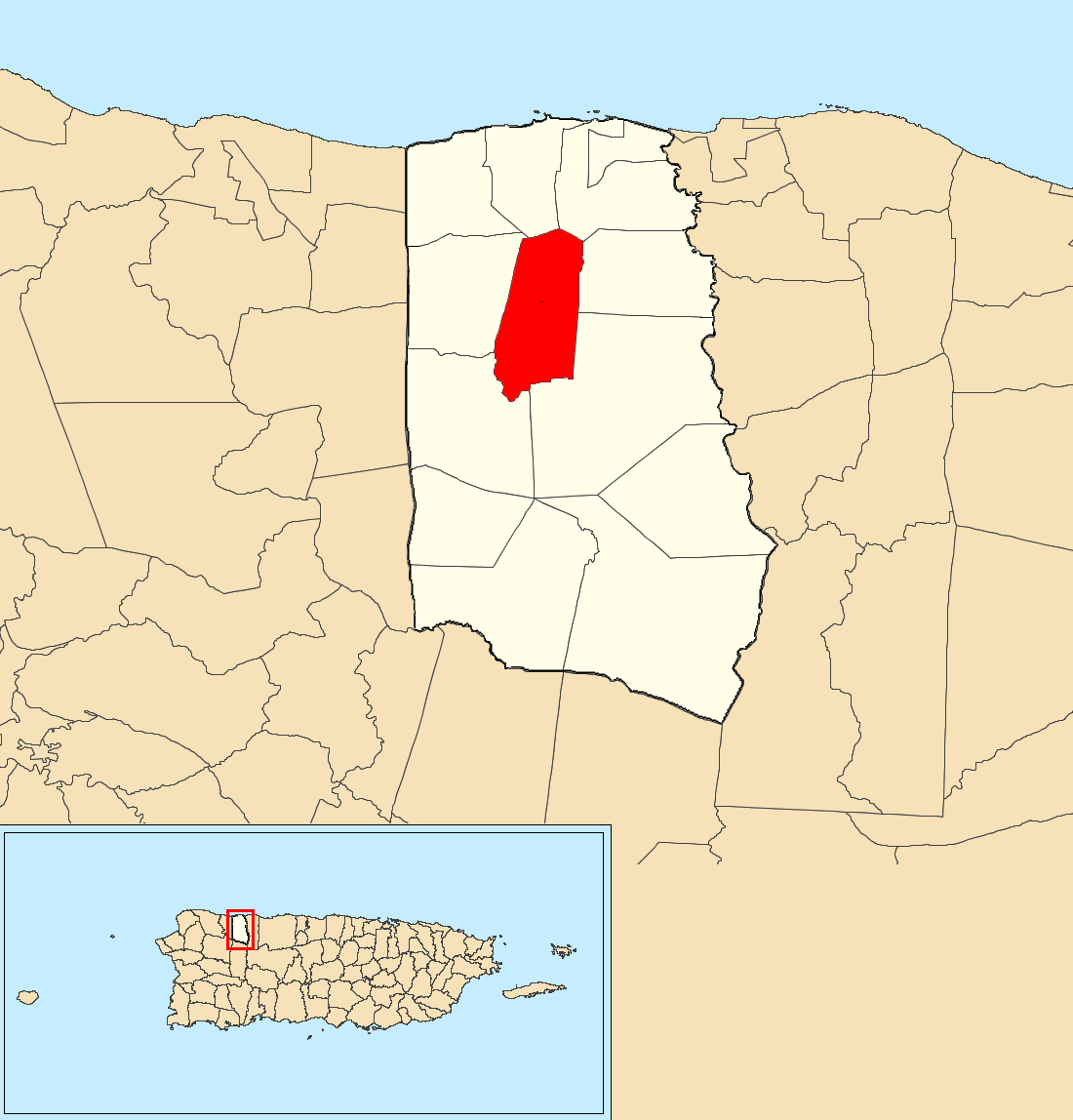
- Location of Ciénagas within the municipality of Camuy shown in red

- Location of Puerto Rico
- Coordinates: 18°26′21″N 66°51′59″W
- Commonwealth: Puerto Rico
- Municipality: Camuy

Area
  - Total: 2.91 sq mi (7.5 km^{2})
  - Land: 2.91 sq mi (7.5 km^{2})
  - Water: 0.00 sq mi (0 km^{2})
- Elevation: 446 ft (136 m)

Population (2010)
  - Total: 1,554
  - Density: 534/sq mi (206/km^{2})
- Source: 2010 Census
- Time zone: UTC−4 (AST)

Ciénagas is a barrio in the municipality of Camuy, Puerto Rico. Its population in 2010 was 1,554.

== History ==
Ciénagas was in Spain's gazetteers until Puerto Rico was ceded by Spain in the aftermath of the Spanish–American War under the terms of the Treaty of Paris of 1898 and became an unincorporated territory of the United States. In 1899, the United States Department of War conducted a census of Puerto Rico finding that the population of Ciénagas barrio was 711.

Historical population
Census	Pop.	Note	%±
1900	711		—
1910	941		32.3%
1920	962		2.2%
1930	940		−2.3%
1940	1,114		18.5%
1950	1,158		3.9%
1960	837		−27.7%
1970	770		−8.0%
1980	1,053		36.8%
1990	1,172		11.3%
2000	1,634		39.4%
2010	1,554		−4.9%
U.S. Decennial Census; 1899 (shown as 1900) 1910-1930; 1930-1950 1980-2000 2010

== See also ==
- List of communities in Puerto Rico
