= Camuy, Puerto Rico =

Town and municipality in Puerto Rico

Camuy Municipio Autónomo de Camuy
- Town and Municipality
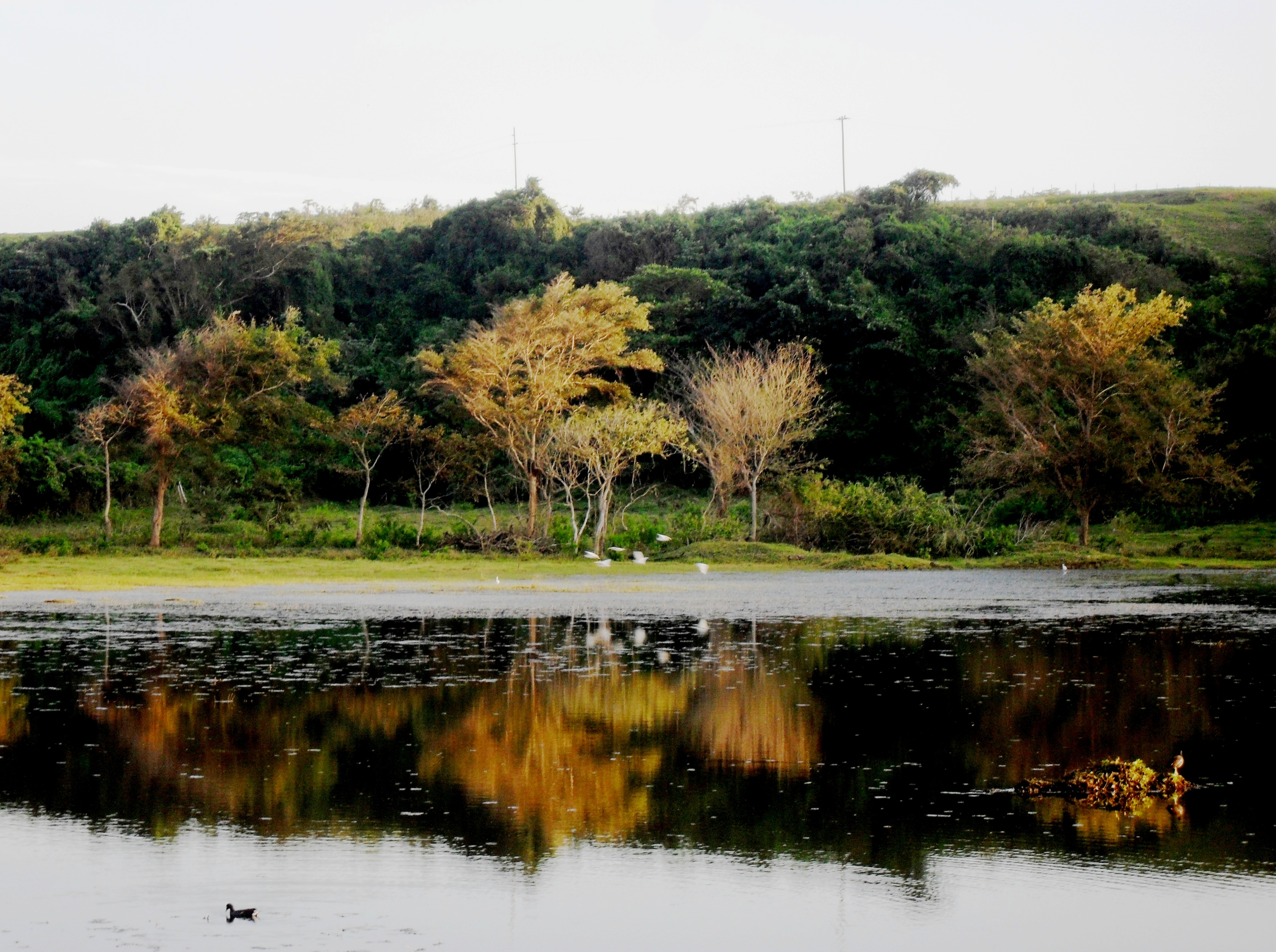

- Flag Coat of arms
- Nicknames: "Ciudad Romántica", "Ciudad de los Areneros", "Ciudad del Sol Taíno, "Valle de las Cavernas"
- Anthem: "Pedazo de Borinquen"
- Map of Puerto Rico highlighting Camuy Municipality
- Coordinates: 18°29′02″N 66°50′42″W
- Sovereign state: United States
- Commonwealth: Puerto Rico
- Settled: early 19th century
- Founded: June 12, 1807
- Founder: Don Ignacio Jiménez
- Barrios: 13 barrios: Abra Honda; Camuy barrio-pueblo; Camuy Arriba; Cibao; Ciénagas; Membrillo; Piedra Gorda; Puente; Puertos; Quebrada; Santiago; Yeguada; Zanja

Government
  - Mayor: Gabriel Hernández Rodríguez (PNP)
  - Senatorial dist.: 3 - Arecibo
  - Representative dist.: 15

Area
  - Total: 61.91 sq mi (160.3 km^{2})
  - Land: 46.43 sq mi (120.3 km^{2})
  - Water: 15.49 sq mi (40.1 km^{2})

Population (2020)
  - Total: 32,827
  - Estimate (2025): 32,691 ▼
  - Rank: 37th in Puerto Rico
  - Density: 707.0/sq mi (273.0/km^{2})
- Demonym: Camuyanos
- Time zone: UTC−4 (AST)
- ZIP Code: 00627
- Area code: 787/939

Camuy (Spanish pronunciation: [kaˈmuj]) is a town and municipality of Puerto Rico, bordering the Atlantic Ocean, north of Lares and San Sebastián; east of Quebradillas; and west of Hatillo. Camuy is spread over 12 barrios and Camuy Pueblo (the downtown area and the administrative center of the city). The town celebrated its 200th anniversary in 2007.

Camuy is part of the "Porta Atlántico" Tourist Area.

== History ==
Camuy, popularly known as Romantic City (la ciudad romántica), was founded in 1807 by Petronila Matos, and formerly part of Arecibo is located in the northwestern coastal region of Puerto Rico, less than 5 minutes west of Hatillo municipality, on PR-2 and PR-119. As early as 1846, Puente Camuy, a bridge over the Camuy River linked Camuy with Hatillo. The name Camuy derives from the Taíno language, although a number of legends give differing explanations for the origin of the name. One such legend claims the name comes from the Taíno word for "sun", another claims derivation from camuy, Taíno for "beautiful scenery", and still another states that Camuy was the name of the Taíno chief Yumac with the letters in reverse order. The "sun" legend is reflected in the coat of arms for the municipality.

Puerto Rico was ceded by Spain in the aftermath of the Spanish–American War and became a territory of the United States. In 1899, the United States Department of War conducted a census of Puerto Rico finding that the population of Camuy was 10,887.

In its beginnings Camuy was integrated into the Partition of San Antonio de la Tuna. The "partitions" were great expanses of land that divided Puerto Rico. This region today is known as Isabela, Puerto Rico. At the time the partition covered the areas between Aguadilla and Arecibo, what is known today as the municipalities of Camuy, Hatillo, Quebradillas, Isabela, Utuado, and San Sebastián.

The population of Camuy was 35,159 at the 2010 census, and it has land area of 46.3 square miles (120 km^{2}). The municipality is part of the San Juan-Caguas-Guaynabo metropolitan area and is a popular suburb. It was named in 2015 by the U.S. Conference of Mayors as one of the most livable cities in the United States.

Hurricane Maria on September 20, 2017 triggered numerous landslides in Camuy with the significant amount of rainfall. Electricity was restored to the town center on October 4. However, rural areas remained without electricity until March 2018. There were catastrophic damages in Camuy with around 2000 residences damaged or completely destroyed. The hospital's roof was torn off. The 40 animal husbandry businesses in Camuy, agriculture, and tourism industries suffered heavy losses. One of the main tourist attractions in Puerto Rico located in Camuy, Parque Nacional de las Cavernas del Río Camuy was destroyed, and would remain closed for four years.

== Geography ==
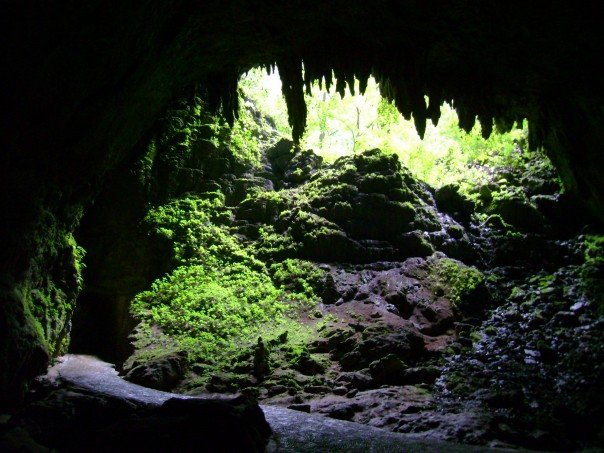
A view from inside the Camuy River Cavern

Camuy belongs to the zone designated as the plateau of the northwest where the terrain is level and known as the Valley of Quebradillas. It is located in the Northern Karst zone of Puerto Rico. In the interior of the municipality the topography becomes very irregular near Cibao. This strip of land, a zone of wooded hills and depressions, divides Camuy completely into two strips, north and south. The northern strip is known as Lomas de los Puertos.

The Camuy River forms part of the hydrographic system with a length of 24 miles, which at one point becomes a narrow canyon that forms one of the most beautiful cave systems in the world: the Rio Camuy Caverns, first explored in 1958. The Camuy River along with the Caverns are the 3rd largest and longest underground system in the world and the river is one of the few remaining active underground rivers in the Americas, stretching for miles. The Cibao River also forms part of the system.

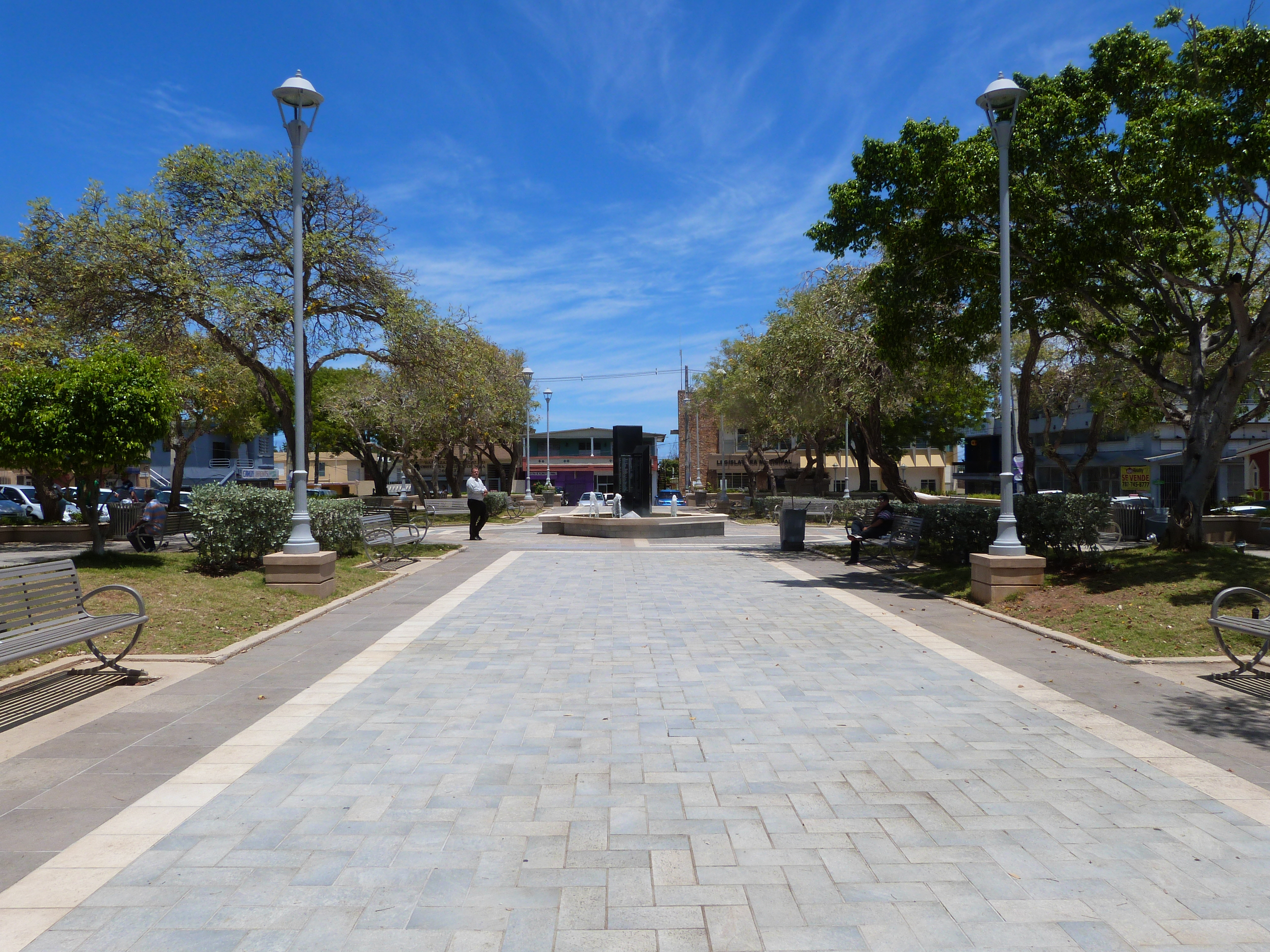
Luis Muñoz Marín town square

=== Barrios ===
Like all municipalities of Puerto Rico, Camuy is subdivided into barrios. The municipal buildings, central square and large Catholic church are located in a small barrio referred to as "el pueblo", near the center of the municipality.

1. Abra Honda
2. Camuy barrio-pueblo
3. Camuy Arriba
4. Cibao
5. Ciénagas
6. Membrillo
7. Piedra Gorda
8. Puente
9. Puertos
10. Quebrada
11. Santiago
12. Yeguada
13. Zanja

=== Sectors ===
Barrios (which are, in contemporary times, roughly comparable to minor civil divisions) and subbarrios, are further subdivided into smaller areas called sectores (sectors in English). The types of sectores may vary, from normally sector to urbanización to reparto to barriada to residencial, among others.

=== Special Communities ===
Comunidades Especiales de Puerto Rico (Special Communities of Puerto Rico) are marginalized communities whose citizens are experiencing a certain amount of social exclusion. A map shows these communities occur in nearly every municipality of the commonwealth. Of the 742 places that were on the list in 2014, the following barrios, communities, sectors, or neighborhoods were in Camuy: Comunidad Puertos, Pueblo Norte (Calle Estrella), Pueblo Nuevo, Puente Peña (Maracayo), and Puente Pica.

== Demographics ==
Historical population
Census	Pop.	Note	%±
1900	10,887		—
1910	11,342		4.2%
1920	14,228		25.4%
1930	16,149		13.5%
1940	18,922		17.2%
1950	20,886		10.4%
1960	19,739		−5.5%
1970	19,922		0.9%
1980	24,884		24.9%
1990	28,917		16.2%
2000	35,244		21.9%
2010	35,159		−0.2%
2020	32,827		−6.6%
2025 (est.)	32,691	▼	−0.4%
U.S. Decennial Census; 1899 (shown as 1900) 1910-1930; 1930-1950 1960-2000 2010 2020

== Tourism ==
Camuy is known for its Parque de las Cavernas del Río Camuy (Camuy River Cave Park), a large network of natural limestone caves and underground waterways shared with nearby municipalities of Hatillo and Lares. The cave system was first documented in the 1973 book Discovery At The Rio Camuy (ISBN 0-517-50594-0) by Russell and Jeanne Gurnee. The park built around the cave system features tours of some of the caves, and is one of the most popular natural attractions in Puerto Rico. The caverns were created by the Río Camuy (Camuy River), the third longest underground river in the world. In recognition of this, the Camuy coat of arms includes a symbol for the underground river.

=== Landmarks and places of interest ===
There are 9 beaches in Camuy, including Peñón Brussi.

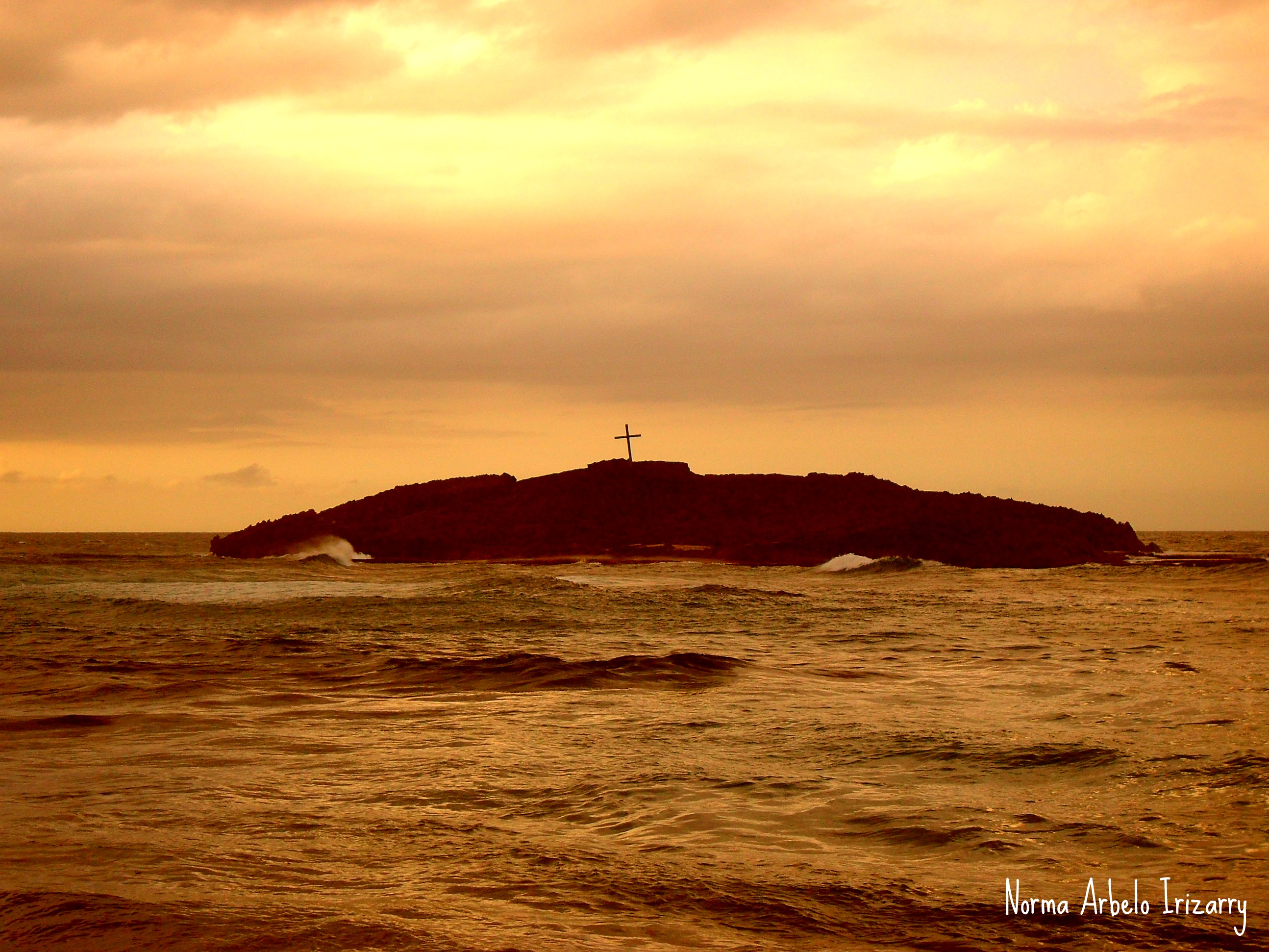
View of Peñon Amador Beach

Other places of interest of Camuy include:

- Hacienda Morell
- Peñon Brusi Beach
- Peñon Amador Beach (Home of the Flamingo)
- Rio Camuy Cave Park
- Paseo Tablado del Río Camuy (Boardwalk)
- Ernesto Memorial Chapel
- Camuy History Museum

To stimulate local tourism during the COVID-19 pandemic in Puerto Rico, the Puerto Rico Tourism Company launched the Voy Turisteando (I'm Touring) campaign in 2021. The campaign featured a passport book with a page for each municipality. The Voy Turisteando Camuy passport page lists Iglesia de Piedra, Balneario Peñon Brusi, and Parque de Las Cavernas del Río Camuy, as places of interest.

== Culture ==
=== Religion ===
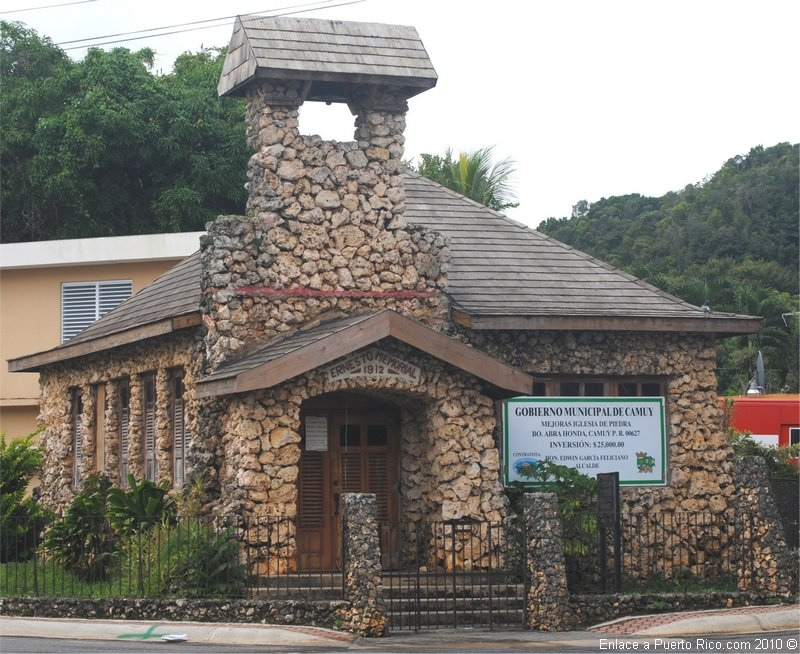
Ernesto Memorial Chapel

Camuy is first and foremost Catholic but there are other religions present in the town, including Protestant denominations such as the Pentecostals, Presbyterians, Methodists, and others. There are four Roman Catholic parishes in Camuy:

- The San Jose Parish named after the patron of the town and located in the town square
- The Miraculous Medal (also known as "El Calvario") in Piedra Gorda
- The Assumption of Mary located in Quebrada
- Our Lady of Montserrate located at Soller near the municipality of Quebradillas
- The Ernesto Memorial Chapel, a Methodist church also known as Iglesia de Piedra (Church of Stone) is famous and on the US National Register of Historic Places, because it was handmade with limestones.

=== Sports ===
The town has many local sports teams (volleyball, basketball, martial arts, swimming etc.) but most notably are their baseball teams. Many of them are part of the little league and the intermediate system but at the top the two professional Class A and Double AA baseball teams called "Los Arenosos" (Referring to the abundance of sand from the coastline).

=== Festivals and Events ===
The patron saint of Camuy is Saint Joseph. His day is celebrated on March 1. The patron saint festivities (Fiestas Patronales) are celebrated every year around the last 2 weeks of the month of March, the month of Saint Joseph. His official liturgical day is March 1. Other festivals and celebrations that take place in Camuy include:

- Velorio Tres Reyes Magos or Three Kings Celebration - January
- Mondongazo Festival - February
- Camuy Carnival - February
- Balseada del Río Camuy and 5k Race - March
- Patron Festivities San José - March
- "Reviving Our Traditions Festival" - June
- Peñon Brussi Beach Festival - July
- Municipal Cultural Fair - November

== Economy ==
=== Agriculture ===
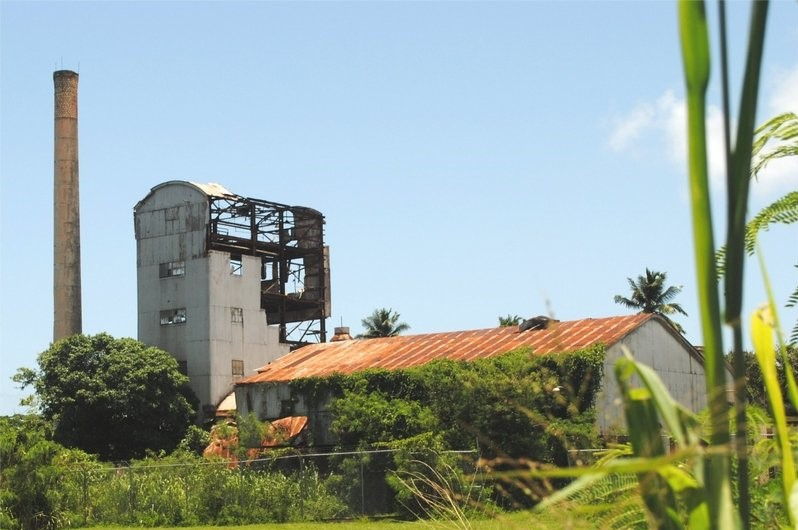
Ruins of La Central Ríollano de Camuy

Agriculture (sugarcane some time ago) and cattle and milk production.

=== Business ===
There's an active manufacturing industry in the city, including companies such as Alaska based Cazador Apparel, Seamless Textiles, Hanes, Best Quality Coop and Camuy Furniture Warehouse. SNC Technical Services is another textile manufacturer in Camuy which picked up production in 2019.

In terms of commercial development, several fast foods franchises, banks and stores can be found in Camuy. Two strip malls are also planned to be constructed in the city.

Tourism plays an important role in Camuy's economy due in part to the Rio Camuy Caves, and Camuy's public beaches.

== Government ==
All municipalities in Puerto Rico are administered by a mayor, elected every four years. The current mayor of Camuy is Gabriel Hernández Rodríguez, of the New Progressive Party (PNP). He was first elected at the 2020 general elections.

The city belongs to the Puerto Rico Senatorial district III, which is represented by two Senators. In 2024, Brenda Pérez Soto and Gabriel González, both from the New Progressive Party (PNP), were elected as District Senators.

== Transportation ==
In 2019, there were 4 bridges in Camuy.

== Symbols ==
The municipio has an official flag and coat of arms.

=== Flag ===
The flag is green like the coat of arms. A white undulating band runs horizontally across and is interrupted in the middle by the figure of the Camuy sun, in this case represented by the colors yellow and black.

=== Coat of arms ===
The silver-waving stripe symbolizes the Camuy River (interrupted in the center because the river goes underground for part of its trajectory). The three tower crown distinguishes Camuy as a municipality.

== Education ==
Camuy currently has 17 public schools and a community college.

== Gallery ==
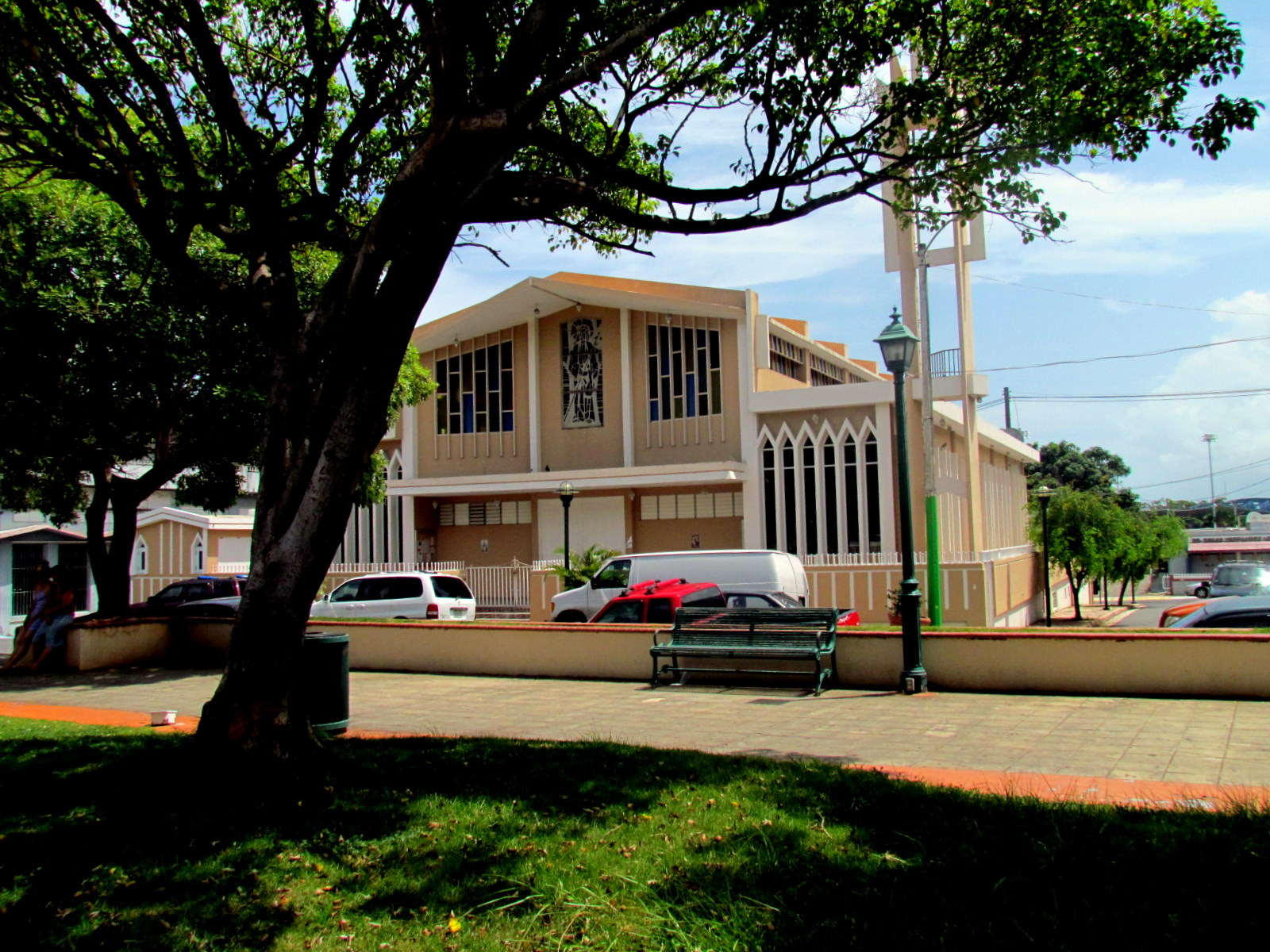
The Camuy parish church in downtown Camuy

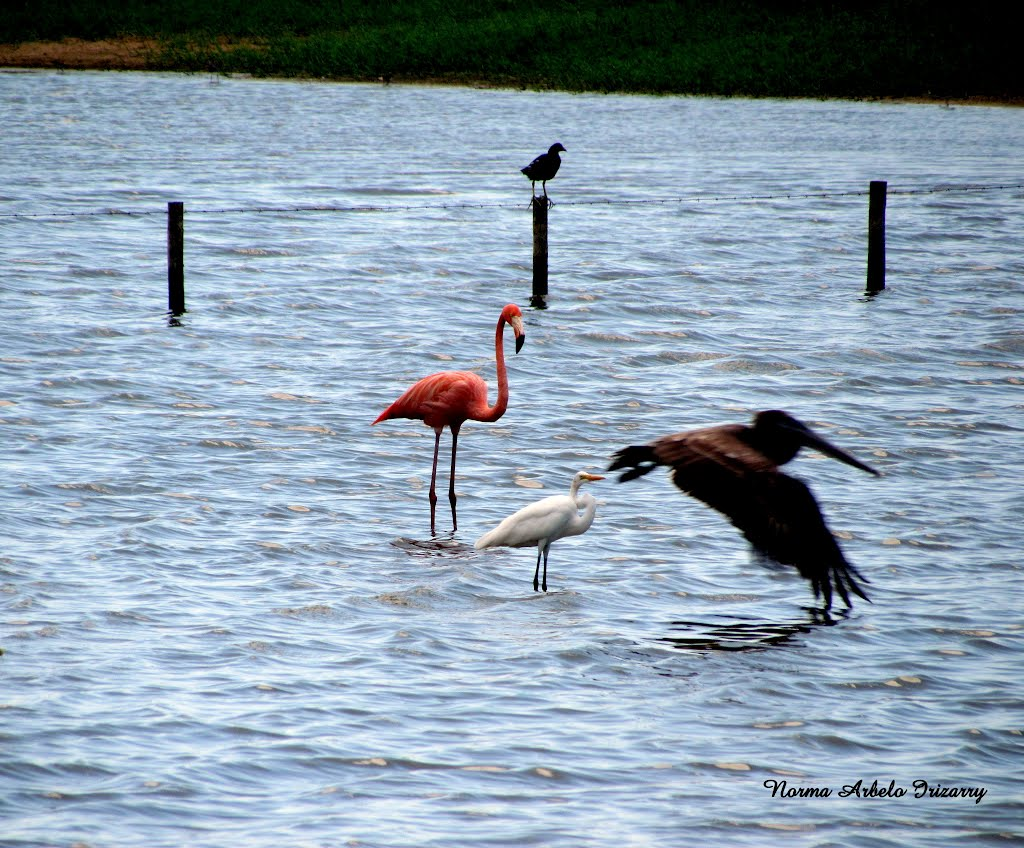
Flamingo and other birds in Yeguada barrio in Camuy

== See also ==
- List of Puerto Ricans
- History of Puerto Rico
