= José Veiga (disambiguation) =

José Veiga (born 1976) is a Cape Verdean footballer.

José Veiga may also refer to:

- José Augusto Ferreira Veiga (1838–1903), Portuguese composer
- José J. Veiga (1915–1999), Brazilian writer
- José Rui Tavares da Veiga (born 1982), Cape Verdean footballer
- José Tomás Veiga, served as Minister of Foreign Affairs (Cape Verde), 1995–1996
