= Yeguada, Camuy, Puerto Rico =

Barrio of Puerto Rico

Yeguada
- Barrio
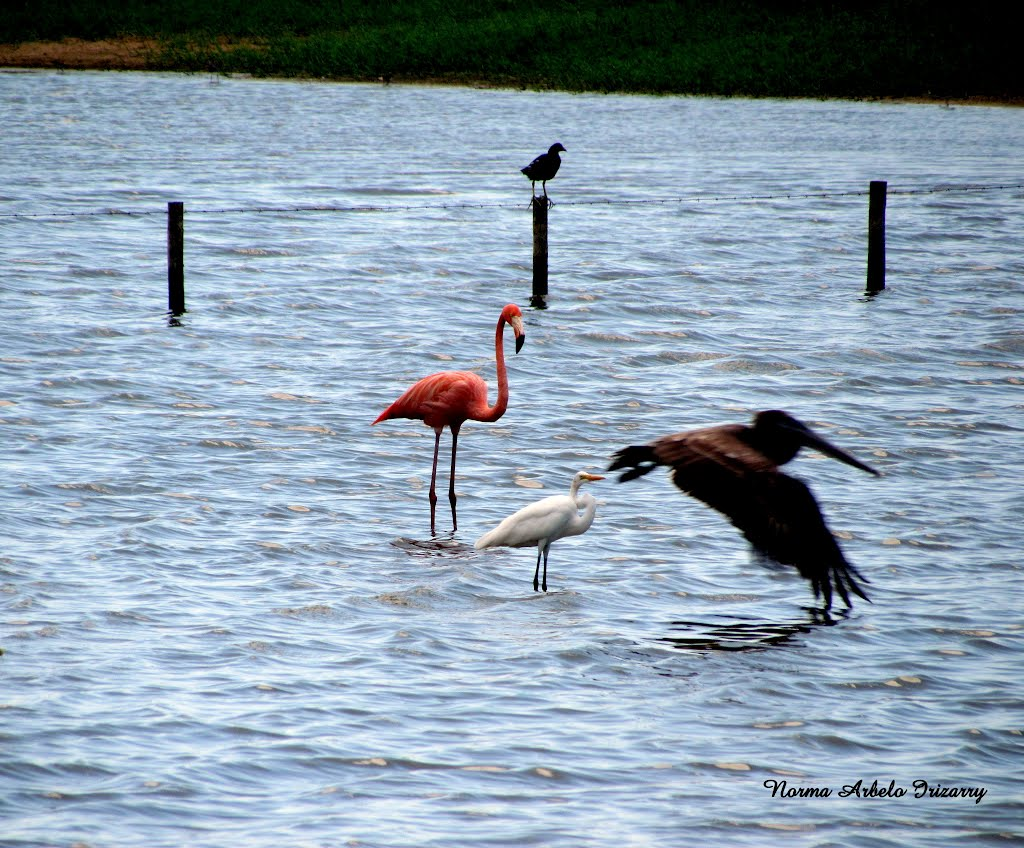
- "Pinky" and other birds in Yeguada

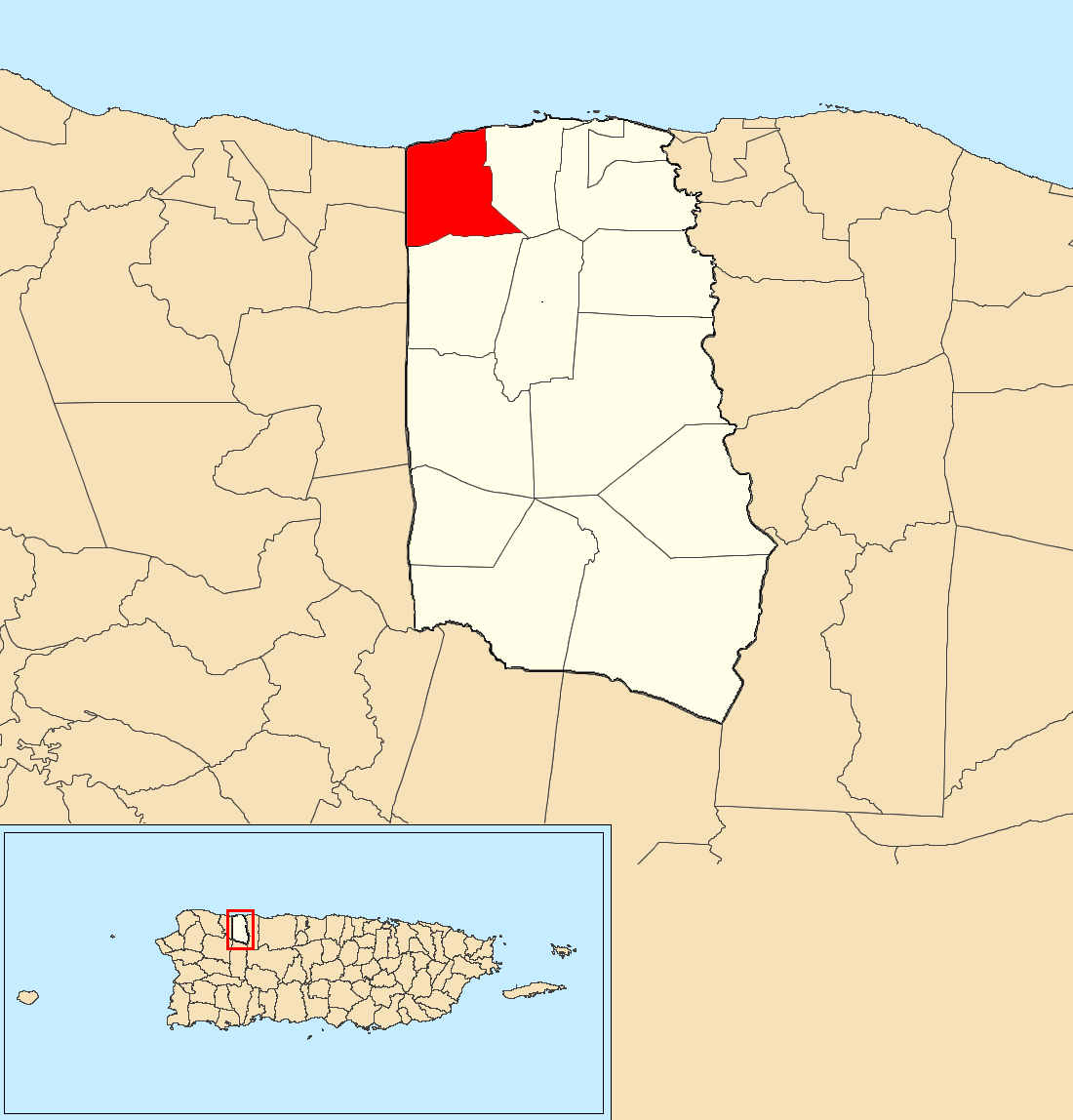
- Location of Yeguada within the municipality of Camuy shown in red

- Location of Puerto Rico
- Coordinates: 18°28′30″N 66°53′40″W
- Commonwealth: Puerto Rico
- Municipality: Camuy

Area
  - Total: 2.86 sq mi (7.4 km^{2})
  - Land: 2.41 sq mi (6.2 km^{2})
  - Water: 0.45 sq mi (1.2 km^{2})
- Elevation: 128 ft (39 m)

Population (2010)
  - Total: 2,581
  - Density: 1,075.4/sq mi (415.2/km^{2})
- Source: 2010 Census
- Time zone: UTC−4 (AST)

Yeguada is a barrio in the municipality of Camuy, Puerto Rico. Its population in 2010 was 2,581.

== History ==
Yeguada was in Spain's gazetteers until Puerto Rico was ceded by Spain in the aftermath of the Spanish–American War under the terms of the Treaty of Paris of 1898 and became an unincorporated territory of the United States. In 1899, the United States Department of War conducted a census of Puerto Rico finding that the population of Yeguada barrio was 794.

Historical population
Census	Pop.	Note	%±
1900	794		—
1910	804		1.3%
1920	773		−3.9%
1930	965		24.8%
1940	1,154		19.6%
1950	1,303		12.9%
1960	1,078		−17.3%
1970	1,197		11.0%
1980	1,564		30.7%
1990	1,817		16.2%
2000	2,565		41.2%
2010	2,581		0.6%
U.S. Decennial Census; 1899 (shown as 1900) 1910-1930; 1930-1950 1980-2000 2010

A Flamingo the locals named "pinky" lived in and around Yeguada for 10 years until she disappeared in 2019.

== See also ==
- List of communities in Puerto Rico
