= Abra Honda, Camuy, Puerto Rico =

Barrio of Puerto Rico

Abra Honda
- Barrio
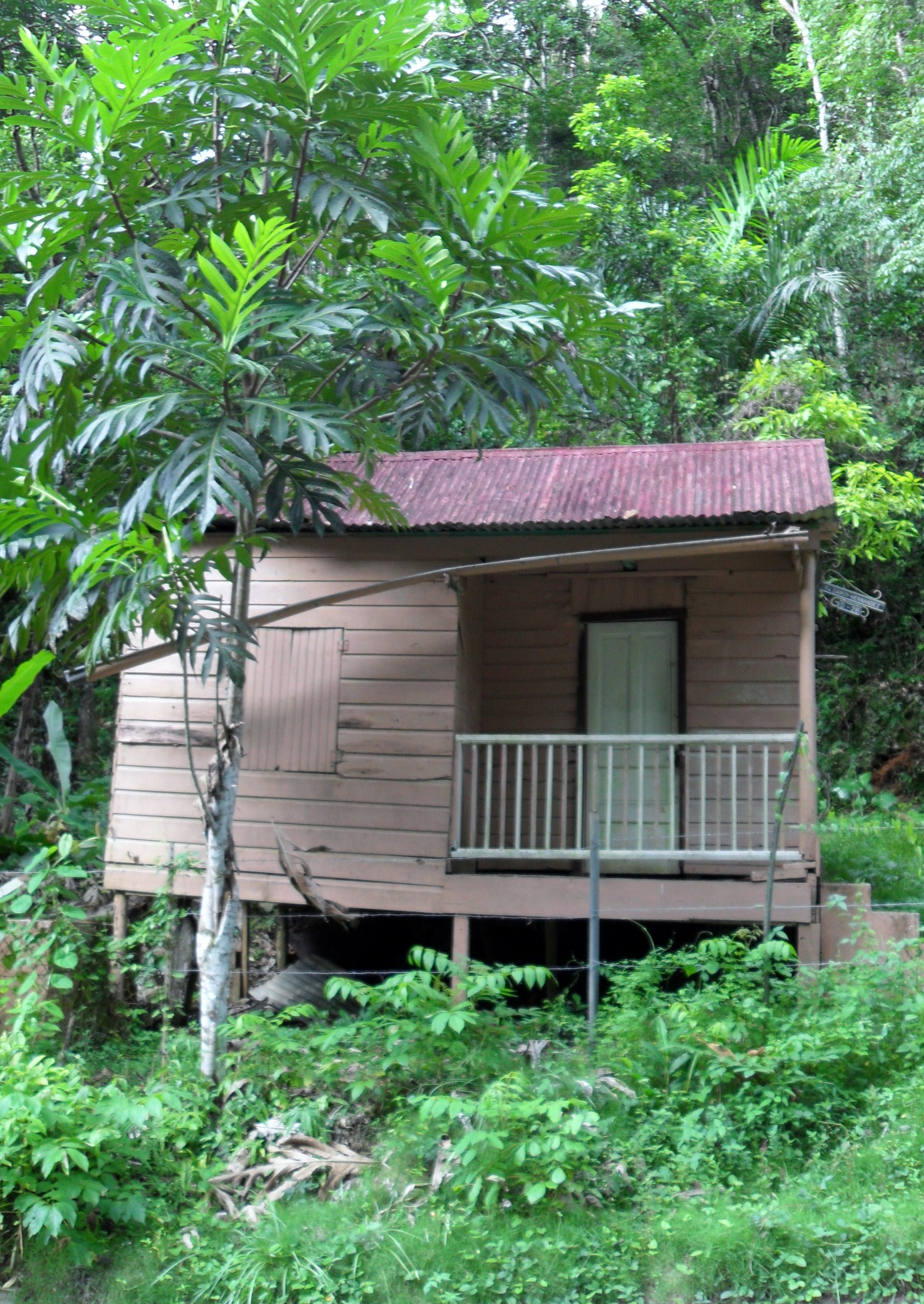
- Wooden shack in Abra Honda

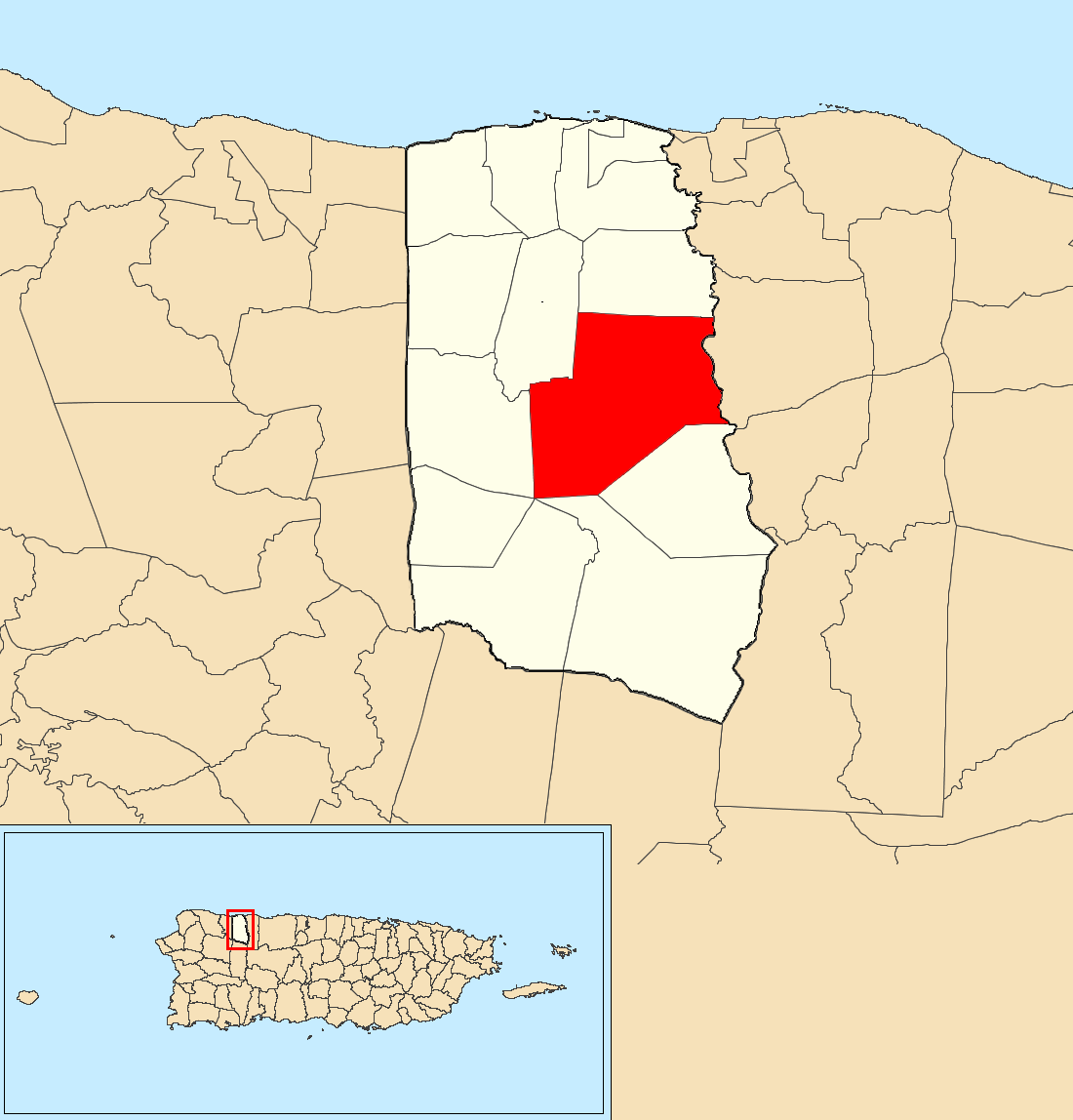
- Location of Abra Honda within the municipality of Camuy shown in red

- Location of Puerto Rico
- Coordinates: 18°25′12″N 66°50′42″W
- Commonwealth: Puerto Rico
- Municipality: Camuy

Area
  - Total: 6.77 sq mi (17.5 km^{2})
  - Land: 6.77 sq mi (17.5 km^{2})
  - Water: 0 sq mi (0 km^{2})
- Elevation: 659 ft (201 m)

Population (2020)
  - Total: 1,785
  - Density: 287.4/sq mi (111.0/km^{2})
- Source: 2010 Census
- Time zone: UTC−4 (AST)

Abra Honda is a barrio in the municipality of Camuy, Puerto Rico. Its population in 2010 was 1,943.

== History ==
Abra Honda was in Spain's gazetteers until Puerto Rico was ceded by Spain in the aftermath of the Spanish–American War under the terms of the Treaty of Paris of 1898 and became an unincorporated territory of the United States. In 1899, the United States Department of War conducted a census of Puerto Rico finding that the population of Abra Honda barrio was 1,420.

Historical population
Census	Pop.	Note	%±
1900	1,420		—
1910	1,412		−0.6%
1920	1,543		9.3%
1930	1,525		−1.2%
1940	1,720		12.8%
1950	1,659		−3.5%
1960	1,488		−10.3%
1970	1,469		−1.3%
1980	1,860		26.6%
1990	1,944		4.5%
2000	2,169		11.6%
2010	1,943		−10.4%
2020	1,785		−8.1%
U.S. Decennial Census; 1899 (shown as 1900) 1910-1930; 1930-1950 1970 1980-2000 2010 2020

== Ernesto Memorial Chapel ==
The Ernesto Memorial Chapel, a historic church, made of stone, is located in Abra Honda barrio.

== Gallery ==
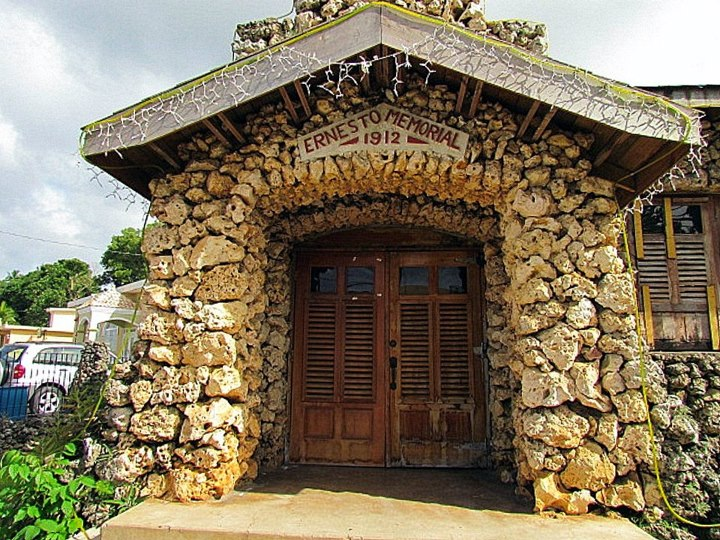
Ernesto Memorial Chapel

== See also ==
- List of communities in Puerto Rico
