= Historical list of the Catholic bishops of Puerto Rico =

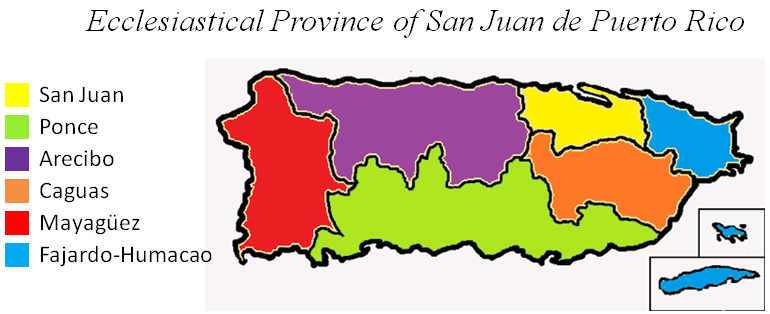
The six dioceses of Puerto Rico

This is a historical list of all Roman Catholic bishops whose sees were on the island of Puerto Rico, with links to the bishops who consecrated them. It includes only members of the Puerto Rican Episcopal Conference and their predecessors. From its establishment in 1531 until the erection of the diocese of Ponce in 1924, the entire island was a single diocese. In 1960, the diocese of San Juan was raised to an archdiocese, and is currently the suffragan see of the five other dioceses on the island: Ponce, Arecibo, Caguas, Mayagüez, and Fajardo–Humacao.

The number references the sequence of consecration. "Diocese" refers to the diocese over which the bishop presided or, if he did not preside, the diocese in which he served as coadjutor bishop or auxiliary bishop. The Roman numeral before the diocese name represents where in the sequence that bishop falls; e.g., the fourth bishop of Arecibo is written "IV Arecibo." Where a diocese is in bold type it indicates that the bishop is the current bishop of that diocese. Titular sees are not listed. Under consecrators are the numbers (or letters) referencing previous bishops on the list. The number listed first represents the principal consecrator. If a series of letters is under "Consecrators," then the consecrators were bishops from outside Puerto Rico (the list of foreign sees is at the bottom of the page).

== Chart of episcopal succession ==
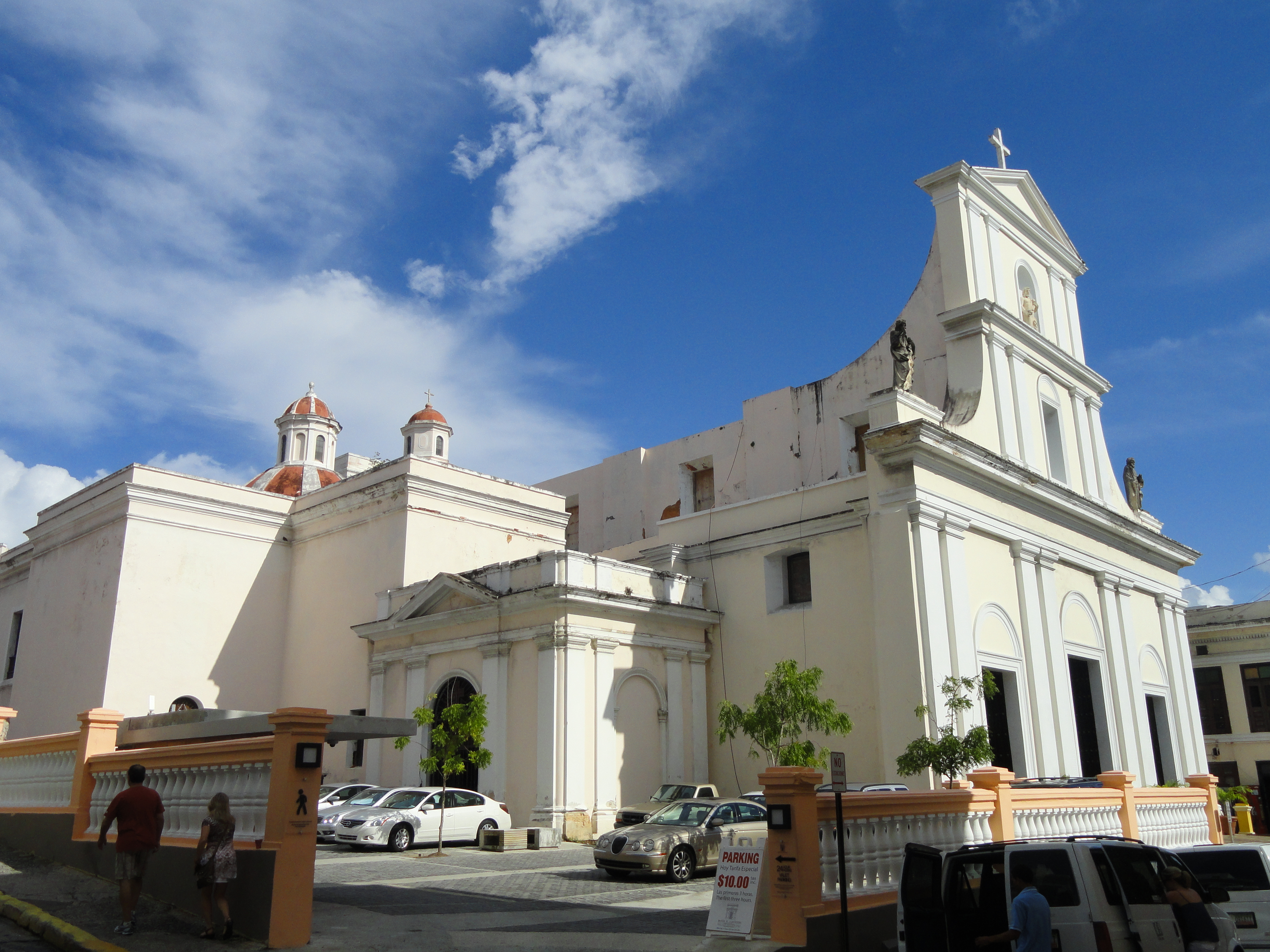
The Cathedral of San Juan Bautista in San Juan

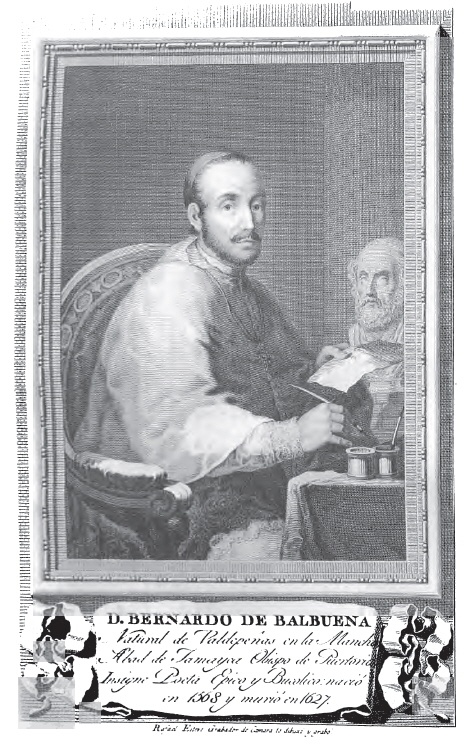
Bernardo de Balbuena (12) is best known for his poetry.

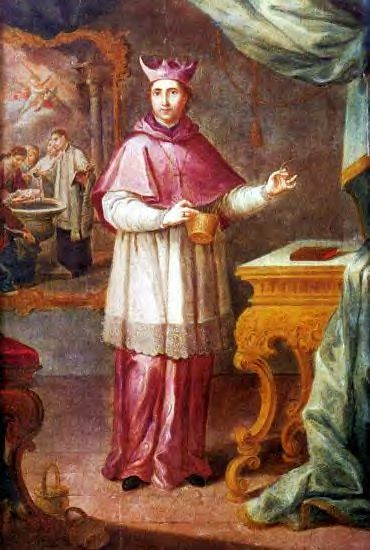
Juan Alejo de Arizmendi (36) was the first Puerto Rican to be consecrated bishop.

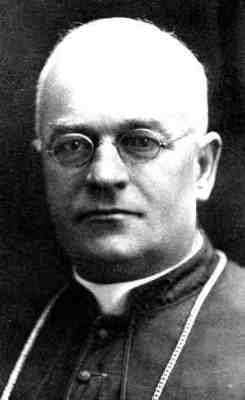
James Blenk (45) was the first bishop after Puerto Rico's annexation by the United States.

- (*) Cardinal
- (‡) Current Diocesan bishop
- Current Auxiliary bishop
- (&) Current Coadjutor bishop
- (°) Apostolic Nuncio

No.	Bishop	Consecrators	Date	Diocese	Ref
1	Alonso Manso	AA1 AB1 AC1	1504	I Puerto Rico (Note: The diocese of Puerto Rico originally covered the entire island. In 1924, the name was changed to San Juan de Puerto Rico when a second diocese was erected on the island. In 1960, it was elevated to an archdiocese.)	
2	Rodrigo de Bastidas y Rodriguez de Romera	AD1	1532	II Puerto Rico	
3	Francisco Andrés de Carvajal	??	1568	III Puerto Rico	
4	Manuel de Mercado Aldrete	AA2	1571	IV Puerto Rico	
5	Diego de Salamanca Polanco	??	1576	V Puerto Rico	
6	Nicolás de Ramos y Santos	??	1588	VI Puerto Rico	
7	Antonio Calderón de León	AE1	1597	VII Puerto Rico	
8	Martín Vasquez de Arce	??	1599	VIII Puerto Rico	
9	Alonso de Monroy (Note: Selected and consecrated, but died in Spain before leaving for Puerto Rico)	??	1610	IX Puerto Rico	
10	Francisco Diaz de Cabrera y Córdoba	??	1614	X Puerto Rico	
11	Pedro de Solier y Vargas	AF1	1616	XI Puerto Rico	
12	Bernardo de Balbuena	AF2	1622	XII Puerto Rico	
13	Juan López de Agurto de la Mata	??	1631	XIII Puerto Rico	
14	Juan Alonso de Solis y Mendoza	AF3	1637	XIV Puerto Rico	
15	Juan Damián López de Haro	AG1	1644	XV Puerto Rico	
16	Hernando de Lobo Castrillo	AH1	1650	XVI Puerto Rico	
17	Francisco Naranjo	??	1652	XVII Puerto Rico	
18	Juan Francisco Arnaldo Isasi	??	1656	XVIII Puerto Rico	
19	Benito de Rivas	AI1 AJ1 AK1	1664	XIX Puerto Rico	
20	Bartolomé Garcia de Escañuela	AL1	1670	XX Puerto Rico	
21	Juan de Santiago y León Garabito	AM1	1676	XXI Puerto Rico	
22	Marcos de Sobremonte	??	1677	XXII Puerto Rico	
23	Juan Francisco de Padilla y San Martín	AN1	1684	XXIII Puerto Rico	
24	Jerónimo Nosti de Valdés	AO1 AP1 AQ1	1704	XXIV Puerto Rico	
25	Pedro de la Concepcion Urtiaga	??	1707	XXV Puerto Rico	
26	Fernando de Valdivia y Mendoza	??	1718	XXVI Puerto Rico	
27	Sebastián Lorenzo Pizarro	AR1 AS1 AT1	1728	XXVII Puerto Rico	
28	Francisco Pérez Lozano	AH2	1738	XXVIII Puerto Rico	
-	Francisco Placido de Bejar (Note: Nominated and preconized, but died before being consecrated)	-	1743	Puerto Rico	
29	Francisco Julián de Antolino	AF4	1749	XXIX Puerto Rico	
30	Pedro Martínez de Oneca	AH3	1757	XXX Puerto Rico	
31	Mariano Martí	AH3	1762	XXXI Puerto Rico	
32	Manuel Jiménez Pérez	AU1 AV1 AW1	1771	XXXII Puerto Rico	
33	Felipe José de Tres-Palacios	AF5	1785	XXXIII Puerto Rico	
34	Francisco de Cuerda	AX1 AY1 AZ1	1790	XXXIV Puerto Rico	
35	Juan Bautista de Zengotita	BA1 BB1 BC1	1795	XXXV Puerto Rico	
36	Juan Alejo de Arizmendi	AH4	1804	XXXVI Puerto Rico	
37	Mariano Rodríguez de Olmedo	AX2 AZ2 BD1	1816	XXXVII Puerto Rico	
38	Pedro Gutiérrez de Cos	BE1	1819	XXXVIII Puerto Rico	
39	Francisco Fleix Soláus	BF1 BG1 BH1	1846	XXXIX Puerto Rico	
40	Francisco de la Puente	BF1 AV2 BH1	1846	XL Puerto Rico	
41	Gil Estévez y Tomás	BI1 AG2 BJ1	1848	XLI Puerto Rico	
42	Vicente Benigno Carrión	BK1 BL1 BM1	1858	XLII Puerto Rico	
43	Juan Antonio Puig y Montserrat	BN1 AG3 BO1	1875	XLIII Puerto Rico	
44	Toribio Minguella y Arnedo	BP1° AR2 BQ1	1894	XLIV Puerto Rico	
-		-	-		
45	James Blenk (Note: Also #236 in the United States historical succession of bishops.)	BR1 BS1 BT1	1899	XLV Puerto Rico	
46	William Ambrose Jones	BU1 BV1 BW1	1907	XLVI Puerto Rico	
47	George J. Caruana	BX1 BY1 BZ1	1921	XLVII Puerto Rico	
48	Edwin Byrne (Note: Also #378 in the United States historical succession of bishops.)	CA1 CB1 CC1	1925	I Ponce, XLVIII San Juan de Puerto Rico	
49	Aloysius Joseph Willinger (Note: Also #404 in the United States historical succession of bishops.)	CD1 CE1 CF1	1929	II Ponce	
50	James Peter Davis (Note: Also #493 in the United States historical succession of bishops.)	CG1 CH1 CI1	1943	XLIX San Juan de Puerto Rico (Note: During Davis's tenure, San Juan de Puerto Rico was raised to an archdiocese)	
51	James Edward McManus (Note: Also #526 in the United States historical succession of bishops.)	CJ1 49 CK1	1947	III Ponce	
52	Luis Aponte Martínez*	CL1 50 CM1	1960	Ponce (auxiliary), IV Ponce, L San Juan de Puerto Rico	
53	Alfredo Méndez-Gonzalez	CL1 48 CN1	1960	I Arecibo	
54	Juan de Dios López de Victoria	CO1° CP1 52	1963	San Juan de Puerto Rico (auxiliary)	
55	Juan Fremiot Torres Oliver	CL1 52 53	1964	V Ponce	
56	Rafael Grovas Felix	AH5 CM1 53	1965	I Caguas	
57	Antulio Parrilla-Bonilla	56 52 54	1965	Caguas (auxiliary)	
58	Miguel Rodriguez Rodriguez	52 53 CM1	1974	II Arecibo	
59	Ricardo Antonio Suriñach Carreras	55 54 56	1975	Ponce (auxiliary), VI Ponce	
60	Ulises Aurelio Casiano Vargas	52 55 58	1976	I Mayagüez	
61	Enrique Manuel Hernández Rivera	52 56 58	1979	San Juan de Puerto Rico (auxiliary), II Caguas	
62	Héctor Rivera Pérez	52 56 58	1979	San Juan de Puerto Rico (auxiliary)	
63	Hermín Negrón Santana	52 56 61	1981	San Juan de Puerto Rico (auxiliary)	
64	Álvaro Corrada del Río (Note: Also #1010 in the United States historical succession of bishops.)	CQ1 CR1 CS1	1985	Washington (auxiliary), III Tyler, II Mayagüez	
65	Roberto González Nieves (Note: Also #1047 in the United States historical succession of bishops.)	CT1 CM2 52	1988	Boston (auxiliary), VI Corpus Christi, LI San Juan de Puerto Rico	
66	Iñaki Mallona Txertudi	PP264 CU1 CV1	1992	III Arecibo	
67	Rubén González Medina	52 CW1° 65	2001	III Caguas, VIII Ponce	
68	Félix Lázaro Martínez	59 CX1 66	2002	VII Ponce	
69	Daniel Fernández Torres	65 60 66	2007	San Juan de Puerto Rico (auxiliary), IV Arecibo	
70	Eusebio Ramos Morales^{‡}	65 67 CY°	2008	I Fajardo–Humacao, IV Caguas, **LII San Juan de Puerto Rico**	
71	Alberto Arturo Figueroa Morales^{‡}	65 67 CZ°	2019	San Juan de Puerto Rico (auxiliary), **V Arecibo**	
72	Ángel Luis Ríos Matos^{‡}	64 65 67	2020	**III Mayagüez**	
73	Luis Miranda Rivera^{‡}	65 67 70	2020	**II Fajardo–Humacao**	
74	Tomás González González	65 DA° 67	2023	**San Juan de Puerto Rico (auxiliary)**	
75	Geraldo Ramírez Torres^{‡}	DA 67 72	2026	**IX Ponce**	
76	Gerardo Antonio Vargas Cruz^{&}	70 65 73	2026	**Fajardo-Humacao** (Coadjutor)	

== Abbreviations and notes ==
=== Foreign consecrators ===
- AA=Archbishop of Seville
- AB=Archbishop of Zaragoza
- AC=Bishop of Segorbe-Albarracín
- AD=Bishop of Zamora in Spain
- AE=Bishop of Popayán
- AF=Archbishop of Santo Domingo
- AG=Bishop of Barcelona
- AH=Bishop of Caracas
- AI=Archbishop of Embrun
- AJ=Titular Bishop of Temnos
- AK=Titular Bishop of Troas
- AL=Titular Archbishop of Corinth
- AM=Bishop of Puebla de los Angeles
- AN=Bishop of Orvieto
- AO=Patriarch of the West Indies
- AP=Archbishop of Santafé en Nueva Granada
- AQ=Titular Bishop of Lycopolis
- AR=Bishop of Pamplona
- AS=Titular Bishop of Lares
- AT=Titular Bishop of Isauropolis
- AU=Titular Archbishop of Pharsalus
- AV=Bishop of Coria
- AW=Bishop of Palencia
- AX=Bishop of Jaén
- AY=Bishop of Astorga
- AZ=Bishop of Albarracín
- BA=Archbishop of Toledo
- BB=Bishop of Orihuela
- BC=Titular Bishop of Carystus
- BD=Titular Bishop of Loryma
- BE=Archbishop of Lima
- BF=Bishop of Córdoba
- BG=Bishop of Tui
- BH=Bishop of Canarias
- BI=Archbishop of Tarragona
- BJ=Bishop of Girona
- BK=Titular Archbishop of Lyana
- BL=Bishop of Teruel and Albarracín
- BM=Bishop of Lugo
- BN=Archbishop of Valladolid
- BO=Titular Bishop of Arca in Phoenicia
- BP=Titular Archbishop of Damascus
- BQ=Bishop of Huesca
- BR=Archbishop of New Orleans
- BS=Titular Bishop of Curium
- BT=Titular Bishop of Sidyma
- BU=Titular Archbishop of Sardes
- BV=Bishop of San Cristóbal de la Habana
- BW=Bishop of Cienfuegos
- BX=Titular Archbishop of Philippi
- BY=Titular Archbishop of Apamea in Syria
- BZ=Titular Archbishop of Colossae
- CA=Archbishop of Philadelphia
- CB=Bishop of Wheeling
- CC=Titular Bishop of Thapsus
- CD=Bishop of Brooklyn
- CE=Bishop of Erie
- CF=Titular Bishop of Camuliana
- CG=Bishop of Tucson
- CH=Titular Bishop of Sila
- CI=Titular Bishop of Sanavus
- CJ=Titular Bishop of Anaea
- CK=Titular Bishop of Calynda
- CL=Archbishop of New York
- CM=Bishop of Saint Thomas
- CN=Bishop of Covington
- CO=Titular Archbishop of Claudiopolis in Isauria
- CP=Bishop of Fort Wayne–South Bend
- CQ=Archbishop of Washington
- CR=Titular Bishop of Murthlacum
- CS=Titular Bishop of Walla Walla
- CT=Archbishop of Boston
- CU=Titular Archbishop of Forum Novum
- CV=Titular Archbishop of Tharros
- CW=Titular Archbishop of Gradisca
- CX=Titular Archbishop of Amiternum
- CY=Titular Archbishop of Slebte
- CZ=Titular Archbishop of Mathara in Numidia
- DA=Titular Archbishop of Spello

=== Other abbreviations ===
- PP=Pope

== Sources ==
- Cheney, David M. (2015). "Catholic-Hierarchy: Its Bishops and Dioceses, Current and Past".
- Paniagua Oller, Angel; Doyle, Henry Grattan (October 1918). "Episcopology of Porto Rico". The Catholic Historical Review. 4 (3): 348–364. JSTOR 25011586.

== See also ==
- Historical list of the Catholic bishops of the United States
- List of Catholic bishops of the United States
