= Antulio Parrilla Bonilla =

Puerto Rican Roman Catholic bishop

- Auxiliary Bishop Emeritus of Caguas
- Church: Roman Catholicism
- Archdiocese: San Juan
- Diocese: Caguas
- Appointed: May 25, 1965
- Installed: August 15, 1965
- Term ended: 1968

Orders
- Ordination: May 3, 1952 by James Peter Davis
- Consecration: March 2, 1965 by Rafael Grovas Felix, Luis Aponte Martínez and Juan de Dios López de Victoria

Personal details
- Born: January 6, 1919 San Lorenzo, Puerto Rico
- Died: January 3, 1994 (aged 74) San Juan, Puerto Rico
- Buried: Santa María Magdalena de Pazzis Cemetery
- Education: University of Puerto Rico; Mount St. Mary's University

Antulio Parrilla Bonilla (January 6, 1919 – January 3, 1994) was a Roman Catholic bishop.

Antulio Parrilla Bonilla was born in San Lorenzo, Puerto Rico, on January 6, 1919. He completed his bachelor's degree at the University of Puerto Rico. He was drafted to military service between 1943 and 1946, then entered seminary at Mount St. Mary's University in Maryland, US in 1948, where he studied philosophy and theology. On May 3, 1952, Antulio Parrilla was ordained a Catholic diocesan priest at the Cathedral of San Juan. In 1965, he was consecrated on May 25, 1965 as Titular Bishop of Ucres and Auxiliary of the Diocese of Caguas. He was director of Catholic Social Action and advisor to the Catholic Workers' Youth. He founded the Juan XXIII Social Center for the formation of the laity. He resigned as auxiliary Bishop of Caguas in 1968.

== Episcopal succession ==
Catholic Church titles
Preceded by -	Auxiliary Bishop of Caguas; 1965-1968	Succeeded by -
