= Héctor Rivera Pérez =

Puerto Rican Roman Catholic bishop (1933–2019)

His Excellency, The Most Reverend Héctor Rivera Pérez
- Auxiliary Bishop Emeritus of San Juan; Titular Bishop of Thubunae in Numidia
- Church: Roman Catholicism
- Archdiocese: San Juan
- Appointed: June 11, 1979
- Installed: August 17, 1979
- Term ended: October 31, 2009
- Other post: Titular Bishop of Thubunae in Numidia

Orders
- Ordination: June 12, 1966 by Rafael Grovas Felix
- Consecration: August 17, 1979 by Luis Aponte Martinez, Rafael Grovas Felix, and Miguel Rodriguez Rodriguez

Personal details
- Born: Héctor Manuel Rivera Pérez; May 15, 1933 Naranjito, Puerto Rico
- Died: April 9, 2019 (aged 85) Carolina, Puerto Rico
- Buried: La Resurrección Cemetery in Carolina, Puerto Rico
- Education: Pontifical University of St. Thomas Aquinas

Styles of Héctor Rivera Pérez
- Reference style: His Excellency; The Most Reverend
- Spoken style: Your Excellency
- Religious style: Bishop

Héctor Manuel Rivera Pérez (May 15, 1933 – April 9, 2019) was an auxiliary bishop for the Roman Catholic Archdiocese of San Juan de Puerto Rico.

== Life ==
Bishop Rivera Pérez obtained a Bachelor of Arts degree in theology in 1964 at Niles College Seminary and earned a degree in social Sciences in the year 1969 in the Pontifical University of St. Thomas Aquinas, the Angelicum, in Rome. Rivera Pérez was consecrated a bishop by John Paul II on August 17, 1979 and was ordained Auxiliary Bishop of San Juan at the Roberto Clemente Coliseum in San Juan, Puerto Rico. He retired October 31, 2009. Died on April 9, 2019 at the age of 85 in Carolina, Puerto Rico

== See also ==
- Catholic Church hierarchy
- Catholic Church in the United States
- Historical list of the Catholic bishops of Puerto Rico
- Historical list of the Catholic bishops of the United States
- List of Catholic bishops of the United States
- Lists of patriarchs, archbishops, and bishops

== Episcopal succession ==
Catholic Church titles
Preceded by -	Auxiliary Bishop of San Juan; 1979-2009	Succeeded by -
