= Luis Miranda Rivera =

Puerto Rican Bishop of Fajardo-Humacao (born 1954)

His Excellency, The Most Reverend Luis Miranda Rivera O.Carm
- Bishop of Fajardo-Humacao
- Diocese: Fajardo-Humacao
- Appointed: May 16, 2020
- Installed: August 15, 2020
- Predecessor: Eusebio Ramos Morales

Orders
- Ordination: September 14, 1984 by Luis Aponte Martínez
- Consecration: August 15, 2020 by Roberto González Nieves, Rubén González Medina, and Eusebio Ramos Morales

Personal details
- Born: January 24, 1954 (age 72) Santurce, Puerto Rico, US
- Education: Bayamón Central University; Pontifical University of Salamanca
- Motto: In obsequio Jesu Christi (In the service of Jesus Christ)

Styles of Luis Miranda Rivera
- Reference style: His Excellency; The Most Reverend
- Spoken style: Your Excellency
- Religious style: Bishop

Luis Francisco Miranda Rivera, O.Carm (born January 24, 1954) is a Puerto Rican Catholic prelate who has served as Bishop of Fajardo-Humacao since 2020. He is a member of the Carmelites.

== Biography ==
Luis Miranda Rivera was born on January 24, 1954, in Santurce, Puerto Rico. On September 14, 1984, he was ordained to the priesthood for the Order of Our Lady of Carmel by Cardinal Luis Aponte Martínez. Miranda Rivera has a Bachelor of Philosophy degree from Bayamón Central University in Bayamon, Puerto Rico and a bachelor's degree in Theology of Religious Life from the University of Salamanca in Salamanca, Spain.

=== Bishop of Fajardo-Humacao ===
Pope Francis appointed Miranda Rivera as bishop for the Diocese of Fajardo-Humacao on May 16, 2020. On August 15, 2020, Miranda Rivera was consecrated and installed by Archbishop Roberto González Nieves as bishop.

== See also ==
- Catholic Church hierarchy
- Catholic Church in the United States
- Historical list of the Catholic bishops of Puerto Rico
- List of Catholic bishops of the United States
- Lists of patriarchs, archbishops, and bishops

== Episcopal succession ==
Catholic Church titles
Preceded by Eusebio Ramos Morales	Bishop of Fajardo-Humacao; 2020-Present	Succeeded by Incumbent
