= Tomás González González =

His Excellency, The Most Reverend Tomás González González
- Auxiliary Bishop of San Juan; Titular Bishop of Enera
- Archdiocese: San Juan
- Appointed: September 9, 2023
- Installed: November 18, 2023
- Other post: Titular Bishop of Enera

Orders
- Ordination: August 6, 2001 by Roberto González Nieves
- Consecration: November 18, 2023 by Roberto González Nieves, Piergiorgio Bertoldi, and Rubén González Medina

Personal details
- Born: August 23, 1968 (age 58) Santurce, Puerto Rico, US
- Education: University of Puerto Rico; Pontifical Catholic University of Puerto Rico
- Motto: Y Guiame Por El Camino Eterno (And guide me along the eternal path)

Styles of Tomás González González
- Reference style: His Excellency; The Most Reverend
- Spoken style: Your Excellency
- Religious style: Bishop

Tomás Godrés González González (born August 23, 1968) is a Puerto Rican priest of the Catholic Church who serves as auxiliary bishop for the Archdiocese of San Juan.

== Biography ==
He graduated in Administration from the University of Puerto Rico and then in Theology from the Pontifical Catholic University of Puerto Rico in Ponce, Puerto Rico. He completed his sacred formation at the San Juan Bautista Regional Major Seminary in San Juan, Puerto Rico. On August 6, 2001, González was ordained to the priesthood. Pope Francis appointed González auxiliary bishop for the Archdiocese of San Juan on September 9, 2023. On November 18, 2023, González was consecrated as a bishop.

== See also ==
- Catholic Church hierarchy
- Catholic Church in the United States
- Historical list of the Catholic bishops of Puerto Rico
- List of Catholic bishops of the United States
- Lists of patriarchs, archbishops, and bishops

== Episcopal succession ==
Catholic Church titles
Preceded by -	Auxiliary Bishop of San Juan; 2023-Present	Succeeded by -
