= Archdiocese of San Juan de Puerto Rico =

Archdiocese of the Catholic Church in Puerto Rico

Archdiocese of San Juan de Puerto Rico Archidiœcesis Sancti Joannis Portoricensis Arquidiócesis de San Juan de Puerto Rico
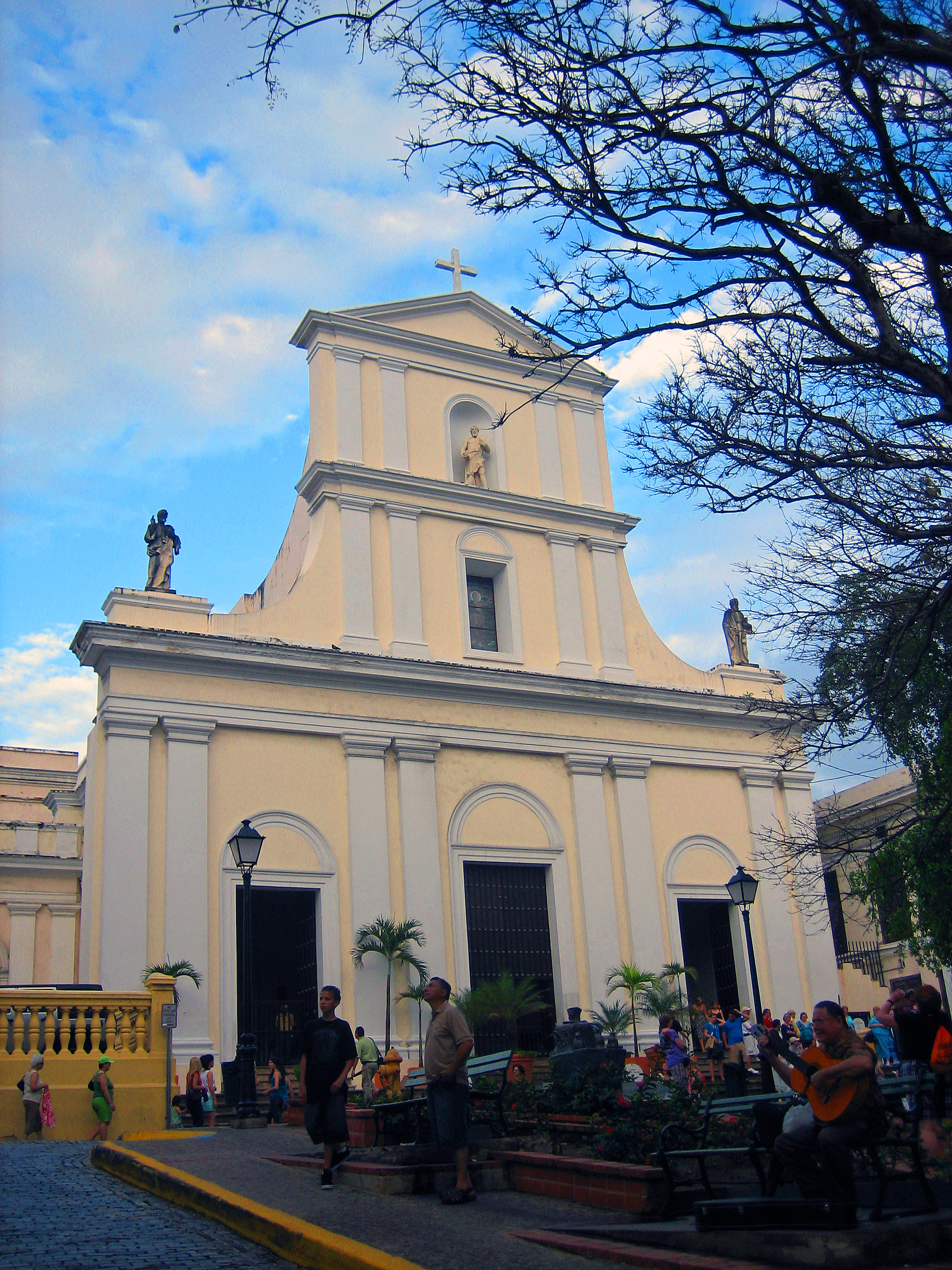
- Cathedral of San Juan Bautista

- Coat of arms

Location
- Territory: Northcentral portion of Puerto Rico
- Ecclesiastical province: Province of San Juan
- Coordinates: 18.4678°N 66.1186°W

Statistics
- Area: 407 sq mi (1,050 km^{2})
- Population: Total; Catholics: (as of 2017); 1,330,000; 929,000 (69.8%)
- Parishes: 177

Information
- Denomination: Catholic
- Sui iuris church: Latin Church
- Rite: Roman Rite
- Established: August 8, 1511 (515 years ago)
- Cathedral: Cathedral Basilica of St. John the Baptist
- Patron saint: St. John the Baptist and Our Lady of Divine Providence

Current leadership
- Pope: Leo XIV
- Archbishop: Eusebio Ramos Morales
- Auxiliary Bishops: Tomás González González
- Bishops emeritus: Roberto González Nieves

Map
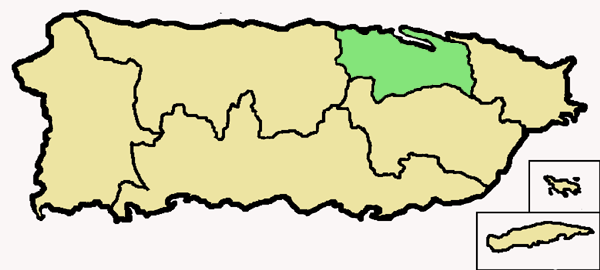

Website
- arqsj.org

The Archdiocese of San Juan de Puerto Rico (Latin: Archidiœcesis Sancti Joannis Portoricensis; Spanish: Arquidiócesis de San Juan de Puerto Rico) is a diocese of the Catholic Church comprising the northeast portion of the island of Puerto Rico.

== Ecclesiastical Province of San Juan ==
The jurisdiction of the Ecclesiastical Province of San Juan covers the Archdiocese of San Juan (that includes the municipalities of Dorado, Toa Baja, Cataño, Toa Alta, Bayamón, Guaynabo, San Juan, Trujillo Alto, and Carolina), which is the metropolitan see of the following suffragan dioceses:

- Arecibo
- Caguas
- Fajardo–Humacao
- Mayagüez
- Ponce

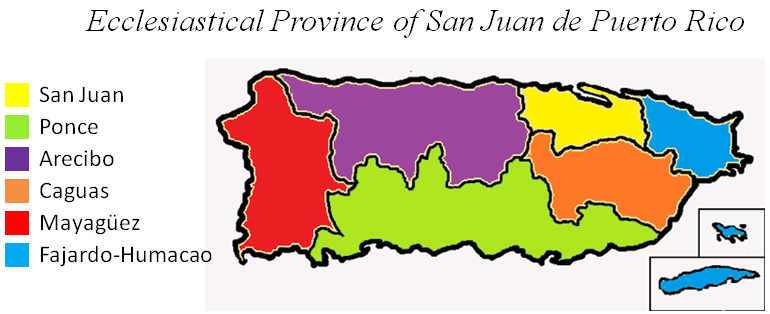
Ecclesiastical Province of San Juan de Puerto Rico map

== History ==
On November 15, 1504, Pope Julius II issued the papal bull Illius fulciti, which erected the first ecclesiastical province in the New World. It established the Archdiocese of Hyaguata (located at Santo Domingo), the Diocese of Magua (located at Concepción de La Vega), and the Diocese of Bayuna (located at Lares de Guahaba). As all the dioceses were located on the island of Hispaniola, the Spanish Crown requested that the Diocese of Bayuna be transferred to Puerto Rico. The Bull never went into effect due to the objection of Ferdinand II of Aragon who opposed that the bull gave the dioceses the right to receive a portion of the earnings from the gold and precious stones discovered in the territory.

On August 8, 1511, Julius II issued the new papal bull Pontifax Romanus, which extinguished the previously granted ecclesiastical province and its dioceses and reassigned their delegated bishops:

- Pedro Suárez de Deza, Bishop-elect of Hyaguata, was reassigned to the Diocese of Concepción de la Vega;
- Father Alonso Manso, Bishop-elect of Magua, was reassigned to the Diocese of Puerto Rico
- Francisco Garcia de Padilla, Bishop-elect of Bayuna, was reassigned to the Diocese of Santo Domingo.

The See of San Juan de Puerto Rico was canonically erected on August 8, 1511, as the Diocese of Puerto Rico on the island of San Juan, as it was then called. Due to the switch of names between the island and the capital its name was changed on November 21, 1924, to the Diocese of San Juan in Puerto Rico. With the creation of the Diocese of Arecibo on April 30, 1960, San Juan was raised to the status of an archdiocese, with the new archbishop leading a metropolitan province comprising all the dioceses on the island as suffragan dioceses.

The Archdiocese of San Juan de Puerto Rico is the metropolitan see for the suffragan dioceses of Caguas, Fajardo–Humacao, Ponce, Mayagüez and Arecibo.

The current archbishop is Eusebio Ramos Morales.

On August 29, 2018, the archdiocese filed for Chapter 11 bankruptcy protection. On September 27, 2018, federal Judge Edward Godoy protected all assets of the archdiocese and its suffragan dioceses under Chapter 11, protecting them from seizures by individual creditors, for example, as payments to retired teachers.

== Bishops ==
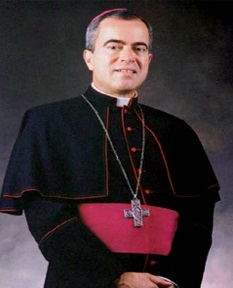
Archbishop Emeritus Nieves (2016)

The lists of bishops, archbishops and auxiliary bishops and their terms of service:

=== Bishops of Puerto Rico ===
1. Alonso Manso (1511–1539 died)
2. Rodrigo de Bastidas y Rodriguez de Romera (1541–1567 resigned)
3. Francisco Andrés de Carvajal, O.F.M. (1568–1570 appointed, Archbishop of Santo Domingo)
4. Manuel de Mercado Aldrete, O.S.H. (1570–1576 appointed, Bishop of Panamá)
5. Diego de Salamanca Polanco, O.S.A. (1576–1587 resigned)
6. Nicolás de Ramos y Santos, O.F.M. (1588–1592 appointed, Archbishop of Santo Domingo)
7. Antonio Calderón de León (1593–1598 appointed, Bishop of Panamá)
8. Martín Vasquez de Arce, O.P. (1599–1609 died)
9. Francisco Diaz de Cabrera y Córdoba, O.P. (1611–1614 appointed, Bishop of Trujillo)
10. Pedro de Solier y Vargas, O.S.A. (1614–1619 appointed, Archbishop of Santo Domingo)
11. Bernardo de Valbuena y Villanueva (1620–1627 died)
12. Juan López de Agurto de la Mata (1631–1634 confirmed, Bishop of Coro)
13. Juan Alonso de Solis y Mendoza, O. Carm. (1636–1641 died)
14. Damián Lopez de Haro y Villarda, O.SS.T. (1643–1648 died)
15. Hernando de Lobo Castrillo, O. Carm. (1649–1651 died)
16. Francisco Naranjo, O.P. (1652–1655 died)
17. Juan Francisco Arnaldo Isasi (1656–1661 died)
18. Benito de Rivas, O.S.B. (1663–1668 died)
19. Bartolomé Garcia de Escañuela, O.F.M. (1670–1676 appointed, Bishop of Durango)
20. Juan de Santiago y León Garabito (1676–1677 confirmed, Bishop of Guadalajara)
21. Marcos de Sobremonte (1677–1681 died)
22. Juan Francisco de Padilla y San Martín, O. de M. (1683–1699 appointed, Bishop of Santa Cruz de la Sierra)
23. Jerónimo Nosti de Valdés, O.S.Bas. (1704–1705 appointed, Bishop of San Cristobal de la Habana)
24. Pedro de la Concepcion y Urtiaga, O.F.M. (1707–1715 died)
25. Raimundo Caballero, O.S.B. (1716–1716 died)
26. Fernando de Valdivia y Mendoza, O.A.R. (1718–1725 died)
27. Sebastián Lorenzo Pizarro, O.S.Bas. (1727–1736 died)
28. Francisco Pérez Lozano, O.S.Bas. (1738–1743 died)
29. Francisco Placido de Béjar, O.S.Bas. (1743–1745 died)
30. Francisco Julián Antolino (1748–1752 confirmed, Bishop of Caracas, Santiago de Venezuela)
31. Pedro Martínez de Oneca (1756–1760 died)
32. Mariano Martí (1761–1770 appointed, Bishop of Caracas, Santiago de Venezuela)
33. Manuel Jiménez Pérez, O.S.B. (1771–1781 died)
34. Felipe José de Tres-Palacios y Verdeja (1784–1789 appointed, Bishop of San Cristobal de la Habana)
35. Francisco de Cuerda (1790–1795 resigned)
36. Juan Bautista de Zengotita y Bengoa, O. de M. (1795–1802 died)
37. Juan Alejo de Arizmendi de La Torre (1803–1814 died)
38. Mariano Rodríguez de Olmedo y Valle (1815–1825 confirmed, Bishop of San Cristobal de la Habana)
39. Pedro Gutiérrez de Cos y Saavedra Seminario (1826–1833 died)
40. Francisco Fleix y Soláns (1846–1846 confirmed, Bishop of San Cristobal de la Habana)
41. Francisco de La Puente, O.P. (1846–1848 confirmed, Bishop of Segovia)
42. Gil Estévez y Tomás (1848–1854 confirmed, Bishop of Tarazona)
43. Vicente Benigno Carrión, O.F.M. Cap. (1857–1871 died)
44. Juan Antonio Puig y Montserrat, O.F.M. (1874–1894 died)
45. Toribio Minguella y Arnedo, O.A.R. (1894–1898 appointed, Bishop of Sigüenza)
46. Francisco Javier Valdés y Noriega, O.S.A. (1898–1899 resigned)
47. James Herbert Blenk, S.M. (1899–1906 appointed, Archbishop of New Orleans, Louisiana)
48. William Ambrose Jones, O.S.A. (1907–1921 died)
49. George Joseph Caruana (1921–1925), title changed with name of diocese

=== Bishops of San Juan de Puerto Rico ===
1. George Joseph Caruana (1924–1925), appointed, Apostolic Delegate to México
2. Edwin Vincent Byrne (8 Mar 1929 - 12 Jun 1943), appointed Archbishop of Santa Fe
3. James Peter Davis (1943–1960), elevated to archbishop

==== Archdiocese of San Juan de Puerto Rico ====
1. James Peter Davis (1960–1964), appointed Archbishop of Santa Fe
2. Luis Aponte Martínez (1964–1999) (elevated to cardinal in 1973)
3. Roberto González Nieves, O.F.M. (1999–2026)
4. Eusebio Ramos Morales, (2026-present)

=== Auxiliary bishops ===
- Juan de Dios López de Victoria (1963–1992); died in office
- Enrique Manuel Hernández Rivera (1979–1981); named Bishop of Caguas
- Héctor Rivera Pérez (1979–2009); retired
- Hermín Negrón Santana (1981–2012); died in office
- Daniel Fernández Torres (2007–2010); appointed Bishop of Arecibo
- Alberto Arturo Figueroa Morales (2019–2022); appointed Bishop of Arecibo
- Tomás González González (2023–present)

=== Other priests of this diocese who became bishops ===
- Rafael Grovas Felix, appointed Bishop of Caguas in 1965
- Antulio Parrilla Bonilla, S.J. (priest here, 1952–1957), appointed auxiliary bishop of Caguas in 1965
- Luis Miranda Rivera, appointed Bishop of Fajardo-Humacao in 2020

== High schools ==
- Academia San José – Guaynabo
- Academia del Perpetuo Socorro – San Juan
- Academia Maria Reina – San Juan
- Academia San Jorge – San Juan
- Colegio Católico Notre Dame – Caguas
- Colegio María Auxiliadora – Carolina
- Colegio San Ignacio de Loyola – San Juan
- Colegio San José – San Juan

== Bankruptcy ==
On January 11, 2018, Catholic Schools of the Archdiocese of San Juan filed for Chapter 11 bankruptcy, stating that the current pension plan was unworkable and applied for a new plan which has an estimated $10 million in assets and $10 million in liabilities. On March 27, 2018, local Judge Anthony Cuevas issued an embargo against the Archdiocese of San Juan which would remain in effect until they could find $4.7 million to pay for teachers pension. It was also ruled that the Catholic Church in Puerto Rico was a single entity and that the embargo would also apply to all the suffragan dioceses of the Archdiocese of San Juan. On August 29, 2018, the Archdiocese of San Juan filed for Chapter 11 bankruptcy, noting that they were unable find the $4.7 million. On September 7, 2018, US Bankruptcy Judge Edward Godoy protected the Archdiocese of San Juan under Chapter 11, avoiding seizure of assets and payment of pensions to their retired teachers. The bankruptcy will also apply to other Dioceses in Puerto Rico as well.
