= Hermín Negrón Santana =

- Auxiliary Bishop of San Juan
- Church: Roman Catholicism
- See: Archdiocese of San Juan de Puerto Rico
- In office: 1981–2012

Orders
- Ordination: May 30, 1969 by Rafael Grovas Felix
- Consecration: September 7, 1981 by Luis Aponte Martínez, Enrique Manuel Hernández Rivera, and Rafael Grovas Felix

Personal details
- Born: November 10, 1937 Naranjito, Puerto Rico
- Died: 10 March 2012 (aged 74) San Juan, Puerto Rico
- Buried: Naranjito Municipal Cemetery in Naranjito, Puerto Rico
- Education: Pontifical Catholic University of Puerto Rico; St. Vincent de Paul Regional Seminary

Hermín Negrón Santana (November 10, 1937 – March 10, 2012) was an auxiliary bishop in the Roman Catholic Archdiocese of San Juan de Puerto Rico. Santana was consecrated a bishop by John Paul II on September 7, 1981.

== Biography ==
He attended his secondary education at Santa Teresita Academy and bachelor's degree at the Pontifical Catholic University of Puerto Rico. Entered the minor seminary San Idelfonso in Aibonito, Puerto Rico in 1955 and joined the greater Regina Cleri Seminary in Ponce, Puerto Rico.; Attended Seminar in Baltimore and St. Vincent de Paul Regional Seminary in Boynton Beach, Florida in 1969. His ordination was on May 30, 1969 through laying on of the hands of Monsignor Rafael Grovas in the San Miguel Arcangel parish in Naranjito, PR. Hermín Negrón Santana was ordained Auxiliary Bishop of San Juan at Complejo Deportivo Jose Pepin Cestero in Bayamon, PR by Archbishop of San Juan Luis Aponte Martínez. He worked as a treasurer at the Puerto Rican Episcopal Conference. He died at his home in Caparra Heights, San Juan, Puerto Rico on the morning of March 10, 2012. He was buried at the Naranjito Municipal Cemetery in Naranjito, Puerto Rico.

== Episcopal succession ==
Catholic Church titles
Preceded by -	Auxiliary Bishop of San Juan; 1981–2012	Succeeded by -
