= Elsa Núñez =

Dominican abstract artist (born 1943)

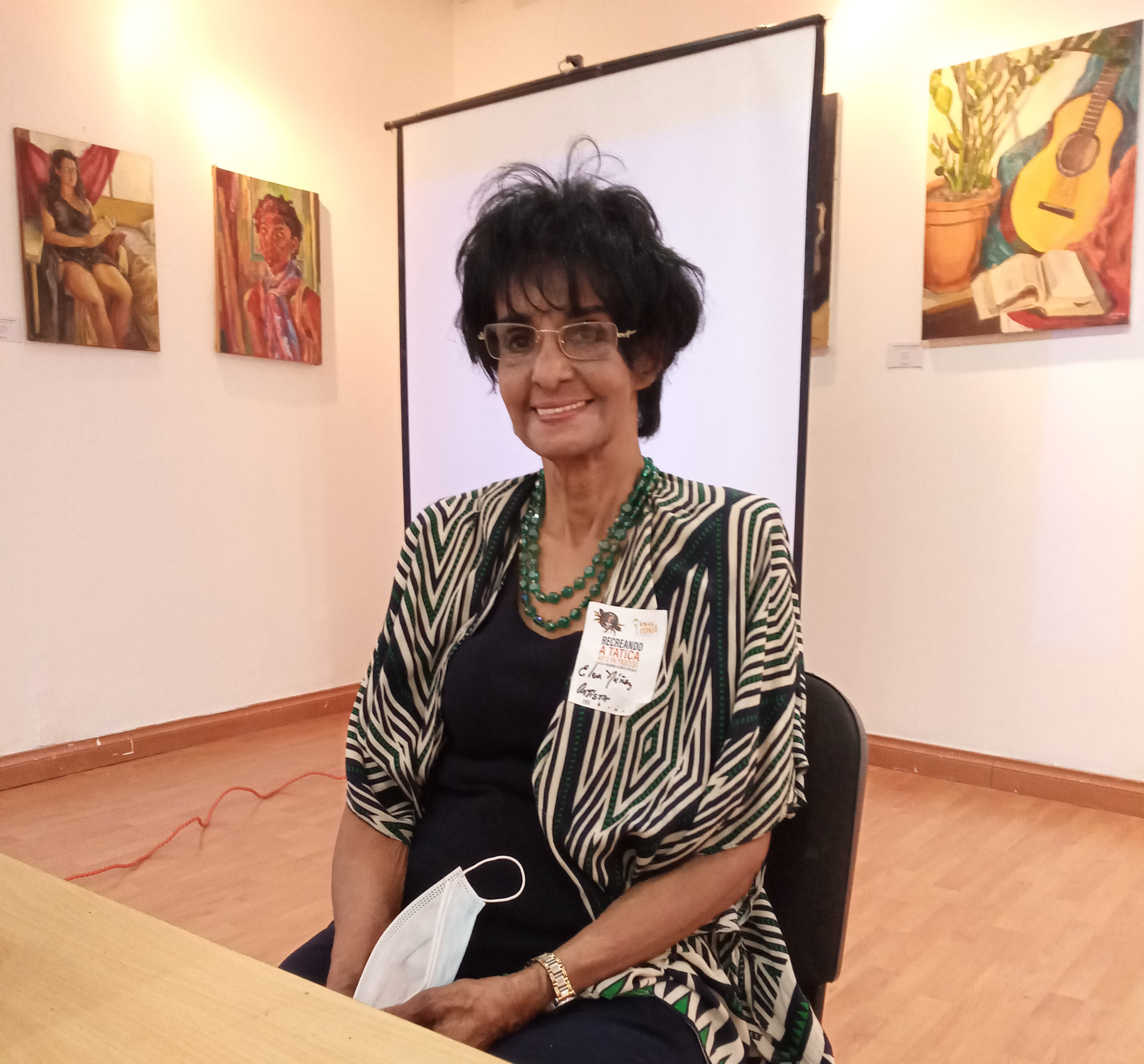
- Elsa Núñez in 2022
- Born: Elsa Luna; 1943 (age 82–83); Santo Domingo, Dominican Republic
- Education: Liceo Las Americas

Elsa Núñez (born 1943) is a Dominican abstract artist whose work spans more than 50 years. Elsa is the daughter of Mercedes Castillo de Núñez and Ramón Antonio Núñez. Her mother was a high school teacher, and her father served as a general in the Dominican military. Elsa's parents had 12 children and raised them in a strict Catholic environment during the Rafael Trujillo dictatorship.

During her years in college, where she studied philosophy, Nuñez joined student-led political movements while, during the military intervention, her brother was killed. Nuñez’s work has run the gamut of artistic styles, from expressionism to abstraction, but the underlying themes remain constant. Sometimes Nuñez turns outward, toward the social conditions of everyday workers in the Dominican Republic or pays tribute to the women who toppled the Trujillo dictatorship. The acrylic painter also envisions female figures and their turbulent inner minds, according to Christina Noriega.

== Education ==
Núñez studied at Colegio María Auxiliadora, which was led by Salesian nuns, and in 1955, the Salesian sisters urged Núñez's father to enroll her in the Escuela Nacional de Bellas Artes. Núñez's artistic gifts influenced the school's director and reputed painter Gilberto Hernández Ortega (1924–1979) to enroll young Elsa in the academy.

Núñez graduated from Instituto de señoritas Salomé Ureña in 1961 with her high school diploma. She studied art at the National School of Fine Arts, graduating in 1962 as a drawing teacher. She attended Universidad Autónoma de Santo Domingo, where she graduated with a degree in Philosophy.

In 1970, she moved overseas to Madrid, Spain, where she completed a post-graduate at the Real Academia de Bellas Artes de San Fernando in Madrid.

== Career ==
Núñez's first solo exhibition appeared in 1963 and received warm praise from local critics. That same year, she joined the Grupo Los Tres (1963–1965) with artists Cándido Bidó (1938–2011) and Lepe (Leopoldo Pérez, 1937), a collective that paid tribute to Grupo Los Cuatro, which had been formed years before by her professors Colson, Gausachs, Hernández Ortega, and Clara Ledesma (1924–1999). "Her early work starting in the first decade of her professional career is characterized by powerful subjects that evoke the human condition, the nature of being, life’s fragility, death, social contrasts, poverty, despair, abuse of power, and the dark outlook of her generation."

While living in Madrid for her postgraduate studies during the 1970s, she modeled for the photographer Cristina García Rodero and met her husband, Dominican painter, actor and filmmaker, Angel Haché. They married in 1973.

Núñez taught painting and drawing at the National School of Fine Arts, Colegio Dominicano de la Salle, la Universidad APEC. Along with her husband, Angel Haché, she directed the Children's Creativity Workshops at the Casa de Teatro, Museo de Arte Moderno y Muse de las Casas Reales. In 1979 she was awarded a scholarship with her husband by UNESCO to visit Children's Creativity Workshops throughout Spain and France, to study the methods of cultural activities that apply in those countries. "Her experiences during the 1970s were reflected in her work through the incorporation of the white color, a reduction of black tones, greater attention to landscapes, musical references, tropical flora and fauna, and painterly qualities reminiscent of the Romantics."

During the 1980s, Elsa's work expanded "its chromatic richness with an emphasis on shades of blue and earth colors, as well as in the textures that shift between realism and abstraction." Her work appeared in 'Homenaje a Vivaldi' (1980), 'Paisajes y figuras' (1984), 'Canto a la primavera' (1984), 'Mi tierra desde su centro' (1985), and 'Exaltación de la mariposa' (1987).

Núñez illustrated the novel Mutanville by Dominican author Arturo Rodríguez Fernández (1948–2010) in 1980 and the poetry volume Viacrucis by the esteemed Dominican bard Máximo Avilés Blonda (1931–1988) in 1983.

During the 1990s, Núñez intensified "her scrutiny of the land as a nurturing mother, the expressive possibilities and meaning of matter and color, increasing the symbolism of her work." She was a contributor to 'Homenaje a las Hermanas Mirabal' (1997), a public art project that was painted on the obelisk located on the seafront road along the coastline of the city of Santo Domingo.

From 1996-1998, Nunez served as president of the Colegio Dominican de Artistas Plásticos (CODAP).

María Elena Ditrén, Director Museum of Modern Art, described Elsa Nuñez's work as a reflection of the turbulent '60s, which were characterized by fear, anxiety and terror of the Trujillo dictatorship and the Revolution of April 1965.

== Awards and recognition ==
- Medalla al Mérito del Ministerio de la Mujer, 1996
- Núñez received the Premio a la Excelencia Profesional given by the president of the Dominican Republic, 2000
- Best solo show at a museum or cultural center, Dominican Association of Art Critics (ADCA/AICA), 2012
- In 2012, The Ministry of Culture and the Museum of Modern Art in Santo Domingo, honored Elsa Núñez with the painting exhibition titled “Elsa Nuñez 1962 Retrospective 2012”, which was formed by 130 paintings spanning her career.
- Premio Nacional de Artes Plásticas from the Ministerio de la Cultura, 2014
