= Rubén González Medina =

21st-century Roman Catholic bishop

His Excellency, The Most Reverend Rubén Antonio González Medina C.M.F.
- Bishop Emeritus of Ponce
- Church: Catholic Church
- Diocese: Ponce
- Appointed: December 22, 2015
- Installed: January 31, 2016
- Retired: June 24, 2026
- Predecessor: Félix Lázaro Martínez, Sch.P.
- Successor: Geraldo Ramírez Torres
- Previous post: Bishop of Caguas (2000-2015)

Orders
- Ordination: February 9, 1975 by Ignacio Nazareno Trejos Picado
- Consecration: February 4, 2001 by Luis Aponte Martinez, François Bacqué, and Roberto González Nieves

Personal details
- Born: February 9, 1949 (age 77) Santurce, Puerto Rico, U.S.
- Education: Seminario Diocesano de Paso Ancho
- Motto: Fijos los ojos en Jesus (Eyes fixed on Jesus)

Styles of Rubén Antonio González Medina
- Reference style: His Excellency; The Most Reverend
- Spoken style: Your Excellency
- Religious style: Bishop

Ordination history of Rubén González Medina
History
Diaconal ordination
- Ordained by: Ignacio Nazareno Trejos Picado
Episcopal consecration
- Consecrated by: Luis Aponte Martínez

Rubén Antonio González Medina, C.M.F. (born February 9, 1949) is a Puerto Rican Catholic prelate who served as Bishop of Ponce from 2015 to 2026. He previously served as Bishop of Caguas from 2000 to 2015. He is a members of the Claretians.

== Biography ==
=== Early life ===
Rubén González was born in Santurce, Puerto Rico, on February 9, 1949. At age 17, in 1966, he entered the Claretian novitiate in Salvatierra, Álava, Spain, and professed temporary religious vows in 1967. From 1969 to 1973, he studied philosophy and completed his first year of theology in Colmenar Viejo, Community of Madrid. In 1972, González professed his perpetual vows as a member of the congregation and later completed his studies at the diocesan seminary of Paso Ancho, Costa Rica.

=== Priesthood ===
González was ordained a deacon in Costa Rica on September 8, 1974. He received his ordination as a priest of the Claretian Order from Bishop Ignacio Nazareno Trejos Picado in Costa Rica on February 9, 1975. González was elected as the local superior of the Claretian Missionaries of the Antilles in 1999.

=== Bishop of Caguas ===
González was appointed Bishop of the Diocese of Caguas by Pope John Paul II on December 12, 2000, taking over from the apostolic administrator, Bishop Álvaro Corrada del Río, S.J. González was consecrated by Cardinal Luis Aponte Martínez on February 4, 2001.

=== Bishop of Ponce ===
On December 22, 2015, González was appointed by Pope Francis as bishop of the Diocese of Ponce; he was installed on January 31, 2016. González is the Grand Prior of the Puerto Rico Lieutenancy of the Equestrian Order of the Holy Sepulchre of Jerusalem.

On June 24, 2026 Pope Leo XIV accepted his resignation after reaching the retirement age of 75.

== See also ==
- Catholic Church hierarchy
- Catholic Church in the United States
- Historical list of the Catholic bishops of Puerto Rico
- List of Catholic bishops of the United States
- Lists of patriarchs, archbishops, and bishops

== Episcopal succession ==
Catholic Church titles
Preceded by Félix Lázaro Martínez	Bishop of Ponce; 2015–2026	Succeeded by Geraldo Ramírez Torres
Preceded by Enrique Manuel Hernández Rivera	Bishop of Caguas; 2000–2015	Succeeded by Eusebio Ramos Morales
