= Diocese of Caguas =

Diocese of the Catholic Church

Coordinates: 18°14′03″N 66°02′03″W

Diocese of Caguas Dioecesis Caguana Diócesis de Caguas
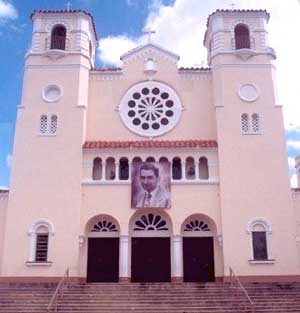
- Catedral Dulce Nombre de Jesús

- Coat of arms

Location
- Country: Puerto Rico
- Territory: Southeast portions of Puerto Rico
- Ecclesiastical province: San Juan de Puerto Rico

Statistics
- Area: 492 sq mi (1,270 km^{2})
- Population: Total; Catholics: (as of 2013); 643,000; 503,000 (78.2%)
- Parishes: 34

Information
- Denomination: Catholic
- Sui iuris church: Latin Church
- Rite: Roman Rite
- Established: 4 November 1964 (62 years ago)
- Cathedral: Catedral Dulce Nombre de Jesús
- Patron saint: María, Madre de la Iglesia (Mary, Mother of the Church)
- Secular priests: 43

Current leadership
- Pope: Leo XIV
- Bishop: Eusebio Ramos Morales
- Metropolitan Archbishop: Roberto González Nieves; Archbishop of San Juan de Puerto Rico
- Bishops emeritus: Enrique Manuel Hernández Rivera

Map
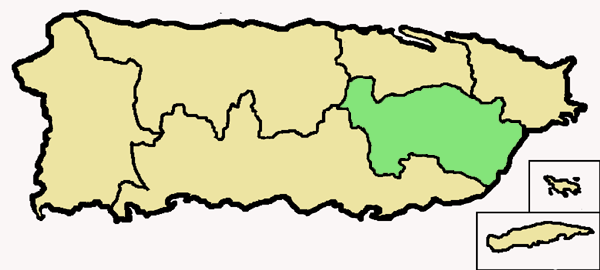

The Diocese of Caguas (Latin: Dioecesis Caguana) is a Latin Church ecclesiastical territory, or diocese, of the Catholic Church in southeastern Puerto Rico in the United States. It is a suffragan diocese in the ecclesiastical province of the metropolitan Archdiocese of San Juan de Puerto Rico

The mother church of the Diocese of Caguas is the Catedral Dulce Nombre de Jesús (Cathedral of the Sweet Name of Jesus) in Caguas. As of 2023, the current bishop of Cagus is Eusebio Ramos Morales. The diocese was erected on November 4, 1964

== Territory ==
The Diocese of Caguas includes the following municipalities:

Naranjito, Barranquitas, Comerío, Aguas Buenas, Caguas, Gurabo, Aibonito, Cidra, Cayey, San Lorenzo, Juncos, Las Piedras, Yabucoa, and Maunabo.

== Bishops ==
=== Bishops of Caguas ===
- Rafael Grovas Felix (1965-1981), Retired
- Enrique Manuel Hernández Rivera (1981-1998) Resigned
- Ruben González Medina, C.M.F. (2000–2015) Appointed, Bishop of Ponce
- Eusebio Ramos Morales (2017-2026), Appointed Archbishop of San Juan de Puerto Rico

=== Auxiliary Bishops ===
- Antulio Parrilla Bonilla (1965–1968); resigned

== San Juan Archdiocese bankruptcy ==
On 7 September 2018, Judge Edward Godoy ruled that the bankruptcy filed by the Archdiocese of San Juan would also apply to every Catholic diocese in Puerto Rico, including Caguas, and that all would now have their assets protected under Chapter 11.

== See also ==
- Caguas, Puerto Rico
- Catholic Church by country
- Catholic Church in the United States
- Global organisation of the Catholic Church
- Ecclesiastical Province of San Juan de Puerto Rico
- List of Roman Catholic archdioceses (by country and continent)
- List of Roman Catholic dioceses (alphabetical) (including archdioceses)
- List of Roman Catholic dioceses (structured view) (including archdioceses)
- List of the Catholic dioceses of the United States
