= Enrique Manuel Hernández Rivera =

Roman Catholic Bishop of Caguas, Puerto Rico

His Excellency, The Most Reverend Enrique Manuel Hernández Rivera
- Bishop Emeritus of Caguas
- Church: Roman Catholicism
- Diocese: Caguas
- Appointed: February 13, 1981
- Installed: March 8, 1981
- Retired: July 28, 1998
- Predecessor: Rafael Grovas Felix
- Successor: Rubén González Medina
- Previous post: Auxiliary Bishop of San Juan and Titular Bishop of Vamalla (1979-1981)

Orders
- Ordination: June 8, 1968
- Consecration: August 17, 1979 by Luis Aponte Martinez, Rafael Grovas Felix, and Miguel Rodriguez Rodriguez

Personal details
- Born: August 12, 1938 (age 87) Camuy, Puerto Rico

Enrique Manuel Hernández Rivera (born August 12, 1938) is a Puerto Rican born American prelate of the Roman Catholic Church. He served as bishop of the Diocese of Caguas in Puerto Rico from 1981 to 1998. He previously serve as an auxiliary bishop of the Archdiocese of San Juan in Puerto Rico from 1979 to 1981.

== Biography ==
Enrique Hernández was born in Camuy, Puerto Rico, on August 12, 1938. He was ordained to the priesthood for the Diocese of Arecibo on June 8, 1968.

On June 11, 1979, Pope John Paul II named Hernández as an auxiliary bishop of the Archdiocese of San Juan. He was consecrated on August 17, 1979, by Cardinal Luis Aponte Martínez at the Roberto Clemente Coliseum in San Juan, Puerto Rico. John Paul II named Hernández as bishop of the Diocese of Caguas on February 13, 1981.

Hernández's resignation as bishop of Caguas was accepted on July 28, 1998, by John Paul II.

== See also ==
- Catholic Church hierarchy
- Catholic Church in the United States
- Historical list of the Catholic bishops of Puerto Rico
- Historical list of the Catholic bishops of the United States
- List of Catholic bishops of the United States
- Lists of patriarchs, archbishops, and bishops

== Episcopal succession ==
Catholic Church titles
Preceded by Rafael Grovas Felix	Bishop of Caguas; 1981–1998	Succeeded by Rubén González Medina
Preceded by –	Auxiliary Bishop of San Juan; 1979–1981	Succeeded by -
