= Igea =

- Municipality
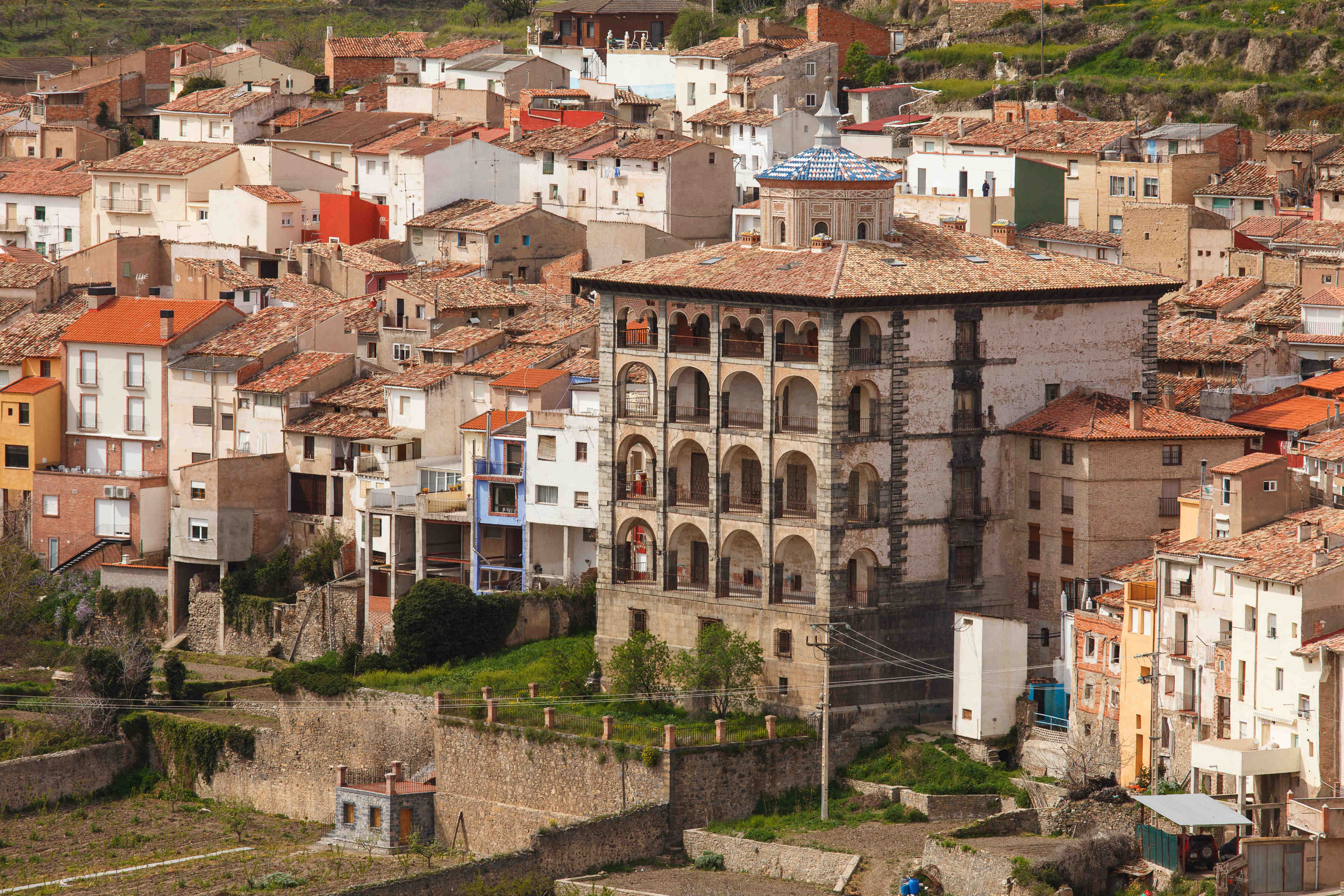
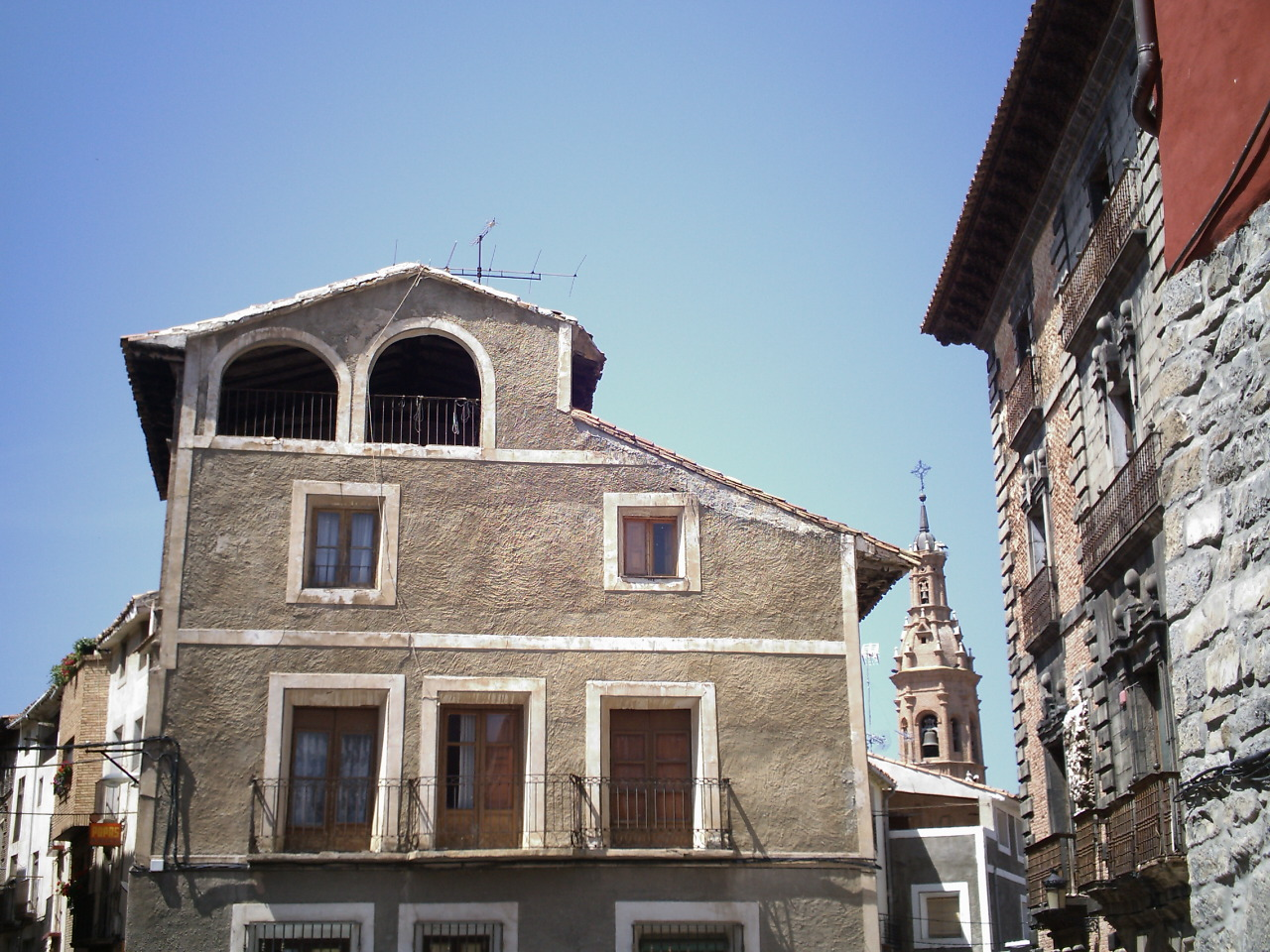
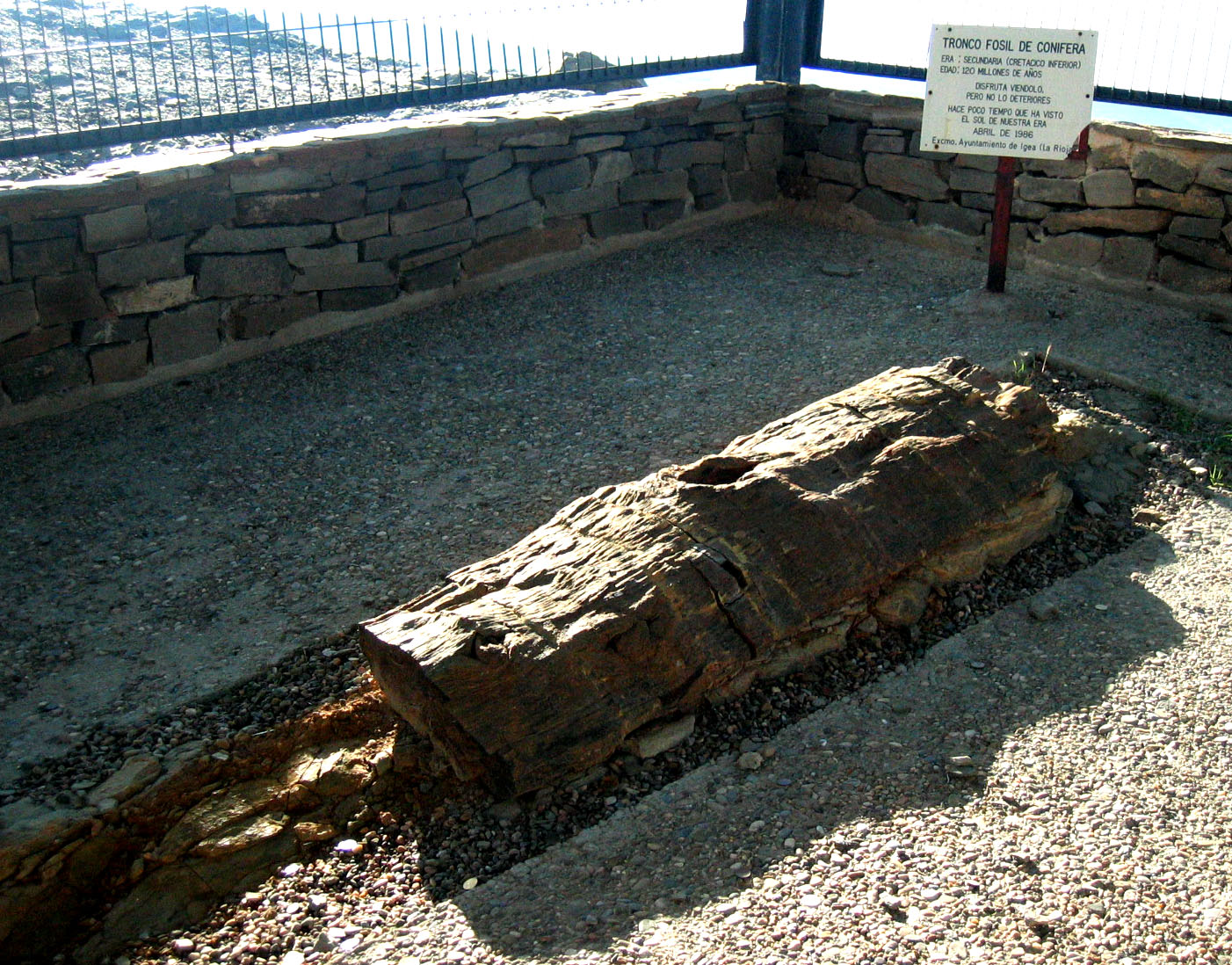
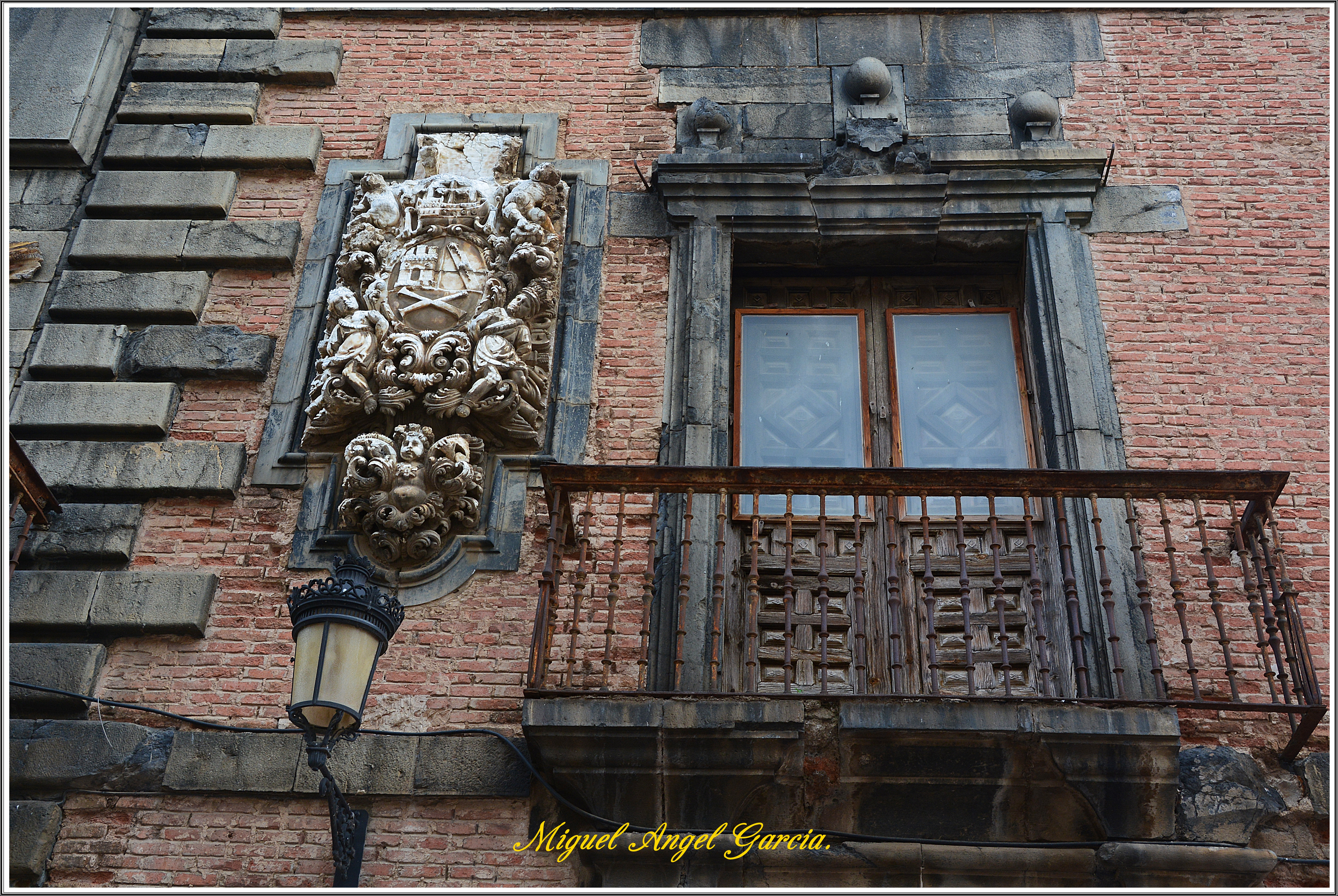
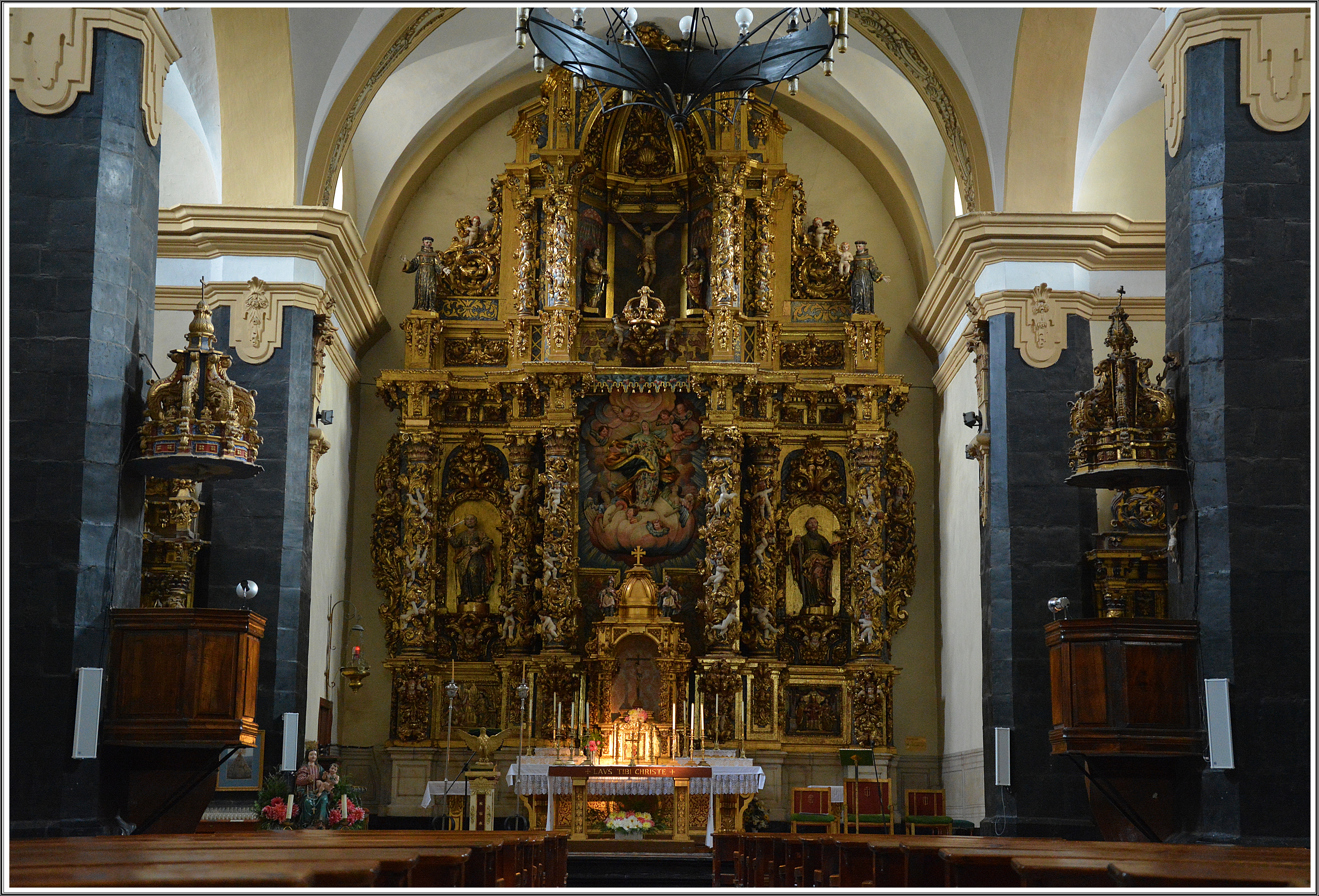
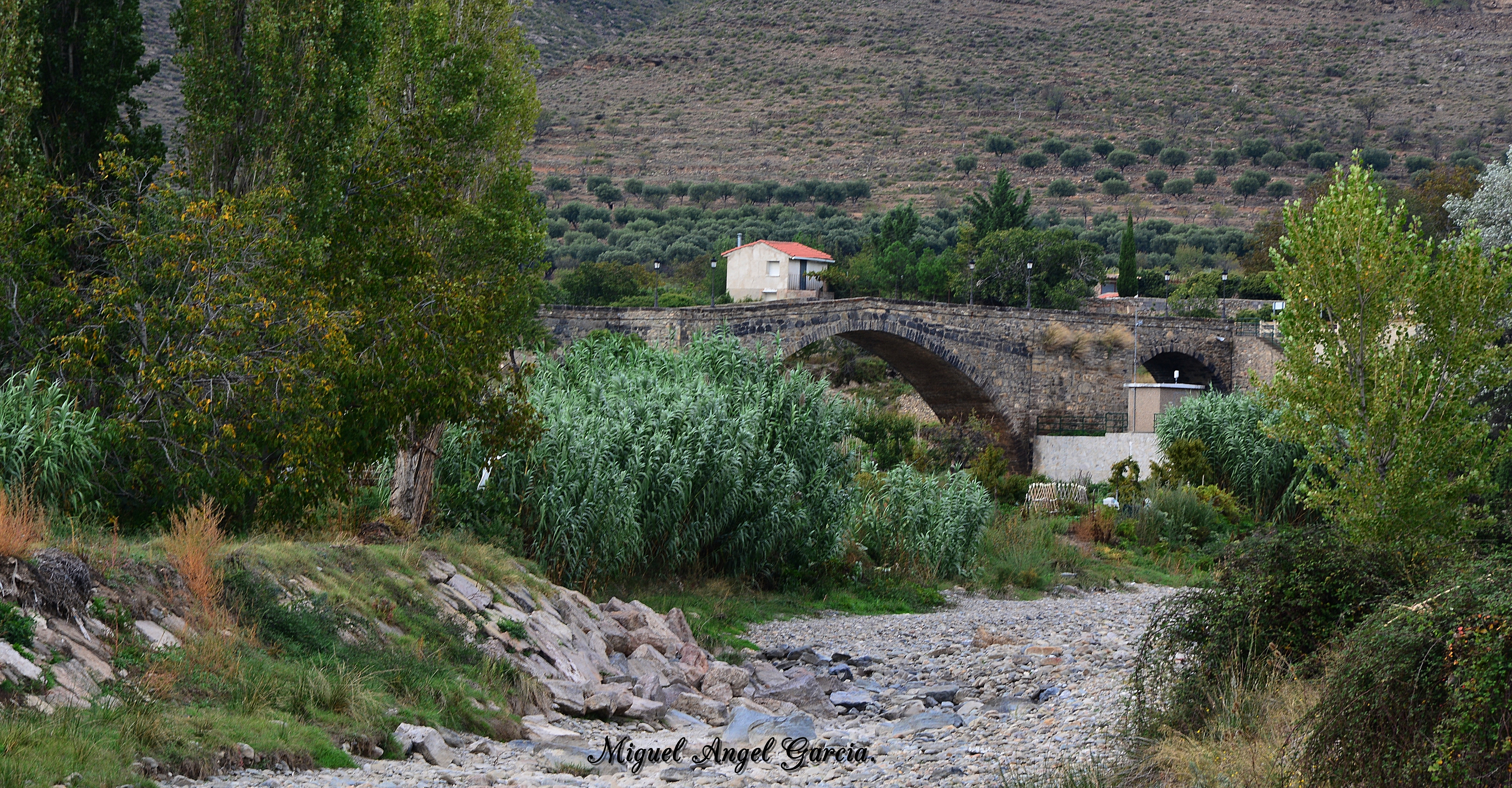

- Coat of arms

- Location of Igea within La Rioja
- Coordinates: 42°04′14″N 2°00′36″W
- Country: Spain
- Autonomous community: La Rioja
- Comarca: Cervera

Government
  - Mayor: Sergio Álvarez Martínez

Area
  - Total: 54.25 km^{2} (20.95 sq mi)
- Elevation: 568 m (1,864 ft)

Population (2025-01-01)
  - Total: 638
  - Density: 11.8/km^{2} (30.5/sq mi)
- Demonym(s): Spanish: Igeano, Igeana
- Time zone: UTC+1 (CET)
  - Summer (DST): UTC+2 (CEST)
- Postal code: 26525
- Website: Official website

Igea is a village in the province and autonomous community of La Rioja, Spain. The municipality covers an area of 54.25 square kilometres (20.95 sq mi) and as of 2011 had a population of 729 people.

== Politics ==
List of mayors since the democratic elections of 1979
| Term | Mayor | Political party |
|---|---|---|
| 1979–1983 | Jesús Sanz Jiménez | CD |
| 1983–1987 | Jesús Sanz Jiménez | PP |
| 1987–1991 | Jesús Sanz Jiménez | PP |
| 1991–1995 | Jesús Sanz Jiménez | PP |
| 1995–1999 | Jesús Sanz Jiménez | PP |
| 1999–2003 | Juan Saez-Benito Muñoz | PP |
| 2003–2007 | Juan Carlos Saez de Guinoa Jiméne | PP |
| 2007–2011 | Sergio Álvarez Martínez | PP |
| 2011–2015 | Sergio Álvarez Martínez | PP |
| 2015–2019 | Sergio Álvarez Martínez | PP |
| 2019–2023 | Sergio Álvarez Martínez | PP |
| 2023– | n/d | n/d |

== Notable people ==
- Toribio Minguella, bishop and senator
- Juan José de Ovejas y Díaz, Marquis de Casa Torre
- Pedro María Sanz Alonso, President of the autonomous community of La Rioja from 1995 to 2015
- Ángel Saéz-Benito
