= Juan de Dios López de Victoria =

Puerto Rican Roman Catholic bishop (1933–2019)

- Auxiliary Bishop of San Juan
- Church: Roman Catholicism
- Archdiocese: San Juan
- Appointed: August 1, 1963
- Installed: September 3, 1963
- Term ended: August 29, 1992

Orders
- Ordination: June 11, 1927
- Consecration: September 3, 1963 by Emanuele Clarizio, Leo Aloysius Pursley, and Luis Aponte Martinez

Personal details
- Born: March 8, 1898 Lares, Puerto Rico
- Died: August 29, 1992 (aged 94) San Juan, Puerto Rico

Juan de Dios López de Victoria (March 8, 1898 – August 29, 1992) was an auxiliary bishop for the Roman Catholic Archdiocese of San Juan de Puerto Rico.

== Life ==
Juan de Dios López de Victoria was born on March 8, 1898, in Lares, Puerto Rico. His ordination was on June 11, 1927, in San Juan Puerto Rico. On June 11, 1979, Pope John Paul II named López de Victoria as an auxiliary bishop of the Archdiocese of San Juan. He was consecrated on September 3, 1963. Served as auxiliary bishop of San Juan for 28 years. He died in office on August 29, 1992, at the age of 94.

== See also ==
- Catholic Church hierarchy
- Catholic Church in the United States
- Historical list of the Catholic bishops of Puerto Rico
- Historical list of the Catholic bishops of the United States
- List of Catholic bishops of the United States
- Lists of patriarchs, archbishops, and bishops

== Episcopal succession ==
Catholic Church titles
Preceded by -	Auxiliary Bishop of San Juan; 1962-1992	Succeeded by -
