= Eusebio Ramos Morales =

Puerto Rican bishop (born 1952)

His Excellency, The Most Reverend Eusebio Ramos Morales
- Archbishop of San Juan
- Church: Roman Catholicism
- Archdiocese: San Juan de Puerto Rico
- Appointed: August 6, 2026
- Installed: September 29, 2026
- Predecessor: Roberto González Nieves
- Previous posts: Bishop of Caguas (2017-2026); Apostolic Administrator of the Roman Catholic Diocese of Fajardo–Humacao (2017-2020); Bishop of Fajardo-Humacao (2008-2017)

Orders
- Ordination: June 3, 1983 by Enrique Hernández Rivera
- Consecration: May 31, 2008 by Roberto González Nieves, Rubén González Medina, and Józef Wesołowski

Personal details
- Born: December 15, 1952 (age 73) Maunabo, Puerto Rico
- Education: Bayamón Central University; St. Vincent de Paul Regional Seminary; Pontifical Gregorian University
- Motto: Fiat mihi secundum verbum Tuum (Let it be done to me according to Your word)

Styles of Eusebio Ramos Morales
- Reference style: His Excellency; The Most Reverend
- Spoken style: Your Excellency
- Religious style: Bishop

Eusebio Ramos Morales (born December 15, 1952) is a Puerto Rican Catholic prelate who serves as Archbishop of San Juan. He previously served as Bishop of Caguas from 2017 to 2026 and as Bishop of Fajardo-Humacao from 2008 to 2017.

== Biography ==
=== Early life ===
Eusebio Ramos Morales was on December 15, 1952, in Maunabo, Puerto Rico. He studied philosophy and theology in Bayamón Central University in Bayamón. He then attended St. Vincent de Paul Regional Seminary in Boynton Beach, Florida, and the Pontifical Gregorian University in Rome.

Ramos Morales was ordained to the priesthood for the Diocese of Caguas on June 3, 1983, by Bishop Enrique Hernández Rivera.

== Episcopal career ==
=== Bishop of Fajardo-Humacao ===
Ramos Morales was appointed by Pope Benedict XVI as the first bishop of the new Diocese of Fajardo-Humacao on March 11, 2008. He was consecrated and installed by Archbishop Roberto González Nieves on May 31, 2008 at Tomás Dones Coliseum, in Fajardo, Puerto Rico. Bishops Rubén González Medina and Józef Wesołowski served as his co-consecrators.

=== Bishop of Caguas ===
On February 2, 2017, Pope Francis appointed Ramos Morales as bishop of the Diocese of Caguas. On February 26, 2017, he was installed as bishop.

=== Archbishop of San Juan ===
Pope Leo XIV appointed Ramos Morales Archbishop of San Juan on August 6, 2026. He was installed on September 29, 2026.

== See also ==
- Catholic Church hierarchy
- Catholic Church in the United States
- Historical list of the Catholic bishops of Puerto Rico
- List of Catholic bishops of the United States
- Lists of patriarchs, archbishops, and bishops

== Episcopal succession ==
Catholic Church titles
Preceded by Roberto González Nieves	Archbishop of San Juan; 2026–present	Succeeded by Incumbent
Preceded by Rubén Antonio González Medina, CMF	Bishop of Caguas; 2017–2026	Succeeded by Sede Vacante
Preceded by First Bishop	Bishop of Fajardo-Humacao; 2008-2017	Succeeded by Luis Miranda Rivera, O.Carm
