= Marcos de Sobremonte =

Most Reverend Marcos de Sobremonte
- Bishop of Puerto Rico
- Church: Catholic Church
- Diocese: Diocese of Puerto Rico
- In office: 1677–1681
- Predecessor: Juan de Santiago y León Garabito
- Successor: Juan Francisco de Padilla y San Martín

Personal details
- Born: 1609 Caracas, Venezuela
- Died: August 10, 1681 (aged 71–72) San Juan, Puerto Rico

Marcos de Sobremonte (1609 – August 10, 1681) was a Roman Catholic prelate who served as Bishop of Puerto Rico (1677–1681).

== Biography ==
Marcos de Sobremonte was born in 1609 in Caracas. On September 13, 1677, he was selected by the King of Spain and confirmed by Pope Innocent XI as Bishop of Puerto Rico. He served as Bishop of Puerto Rico until his death on August 10, 1681.

Catholic Church titles
Preceded by Juan de Santiago y León Garabito	Bishop of Puerto Rico; 1677–1681	Succeeded by Juan Francisco de Padilla y San Martín
