= Toribio Minguella =

Spanish author (1836–1920)

Toribio Minguella y Arnedo
- Bishop of Sigüenza
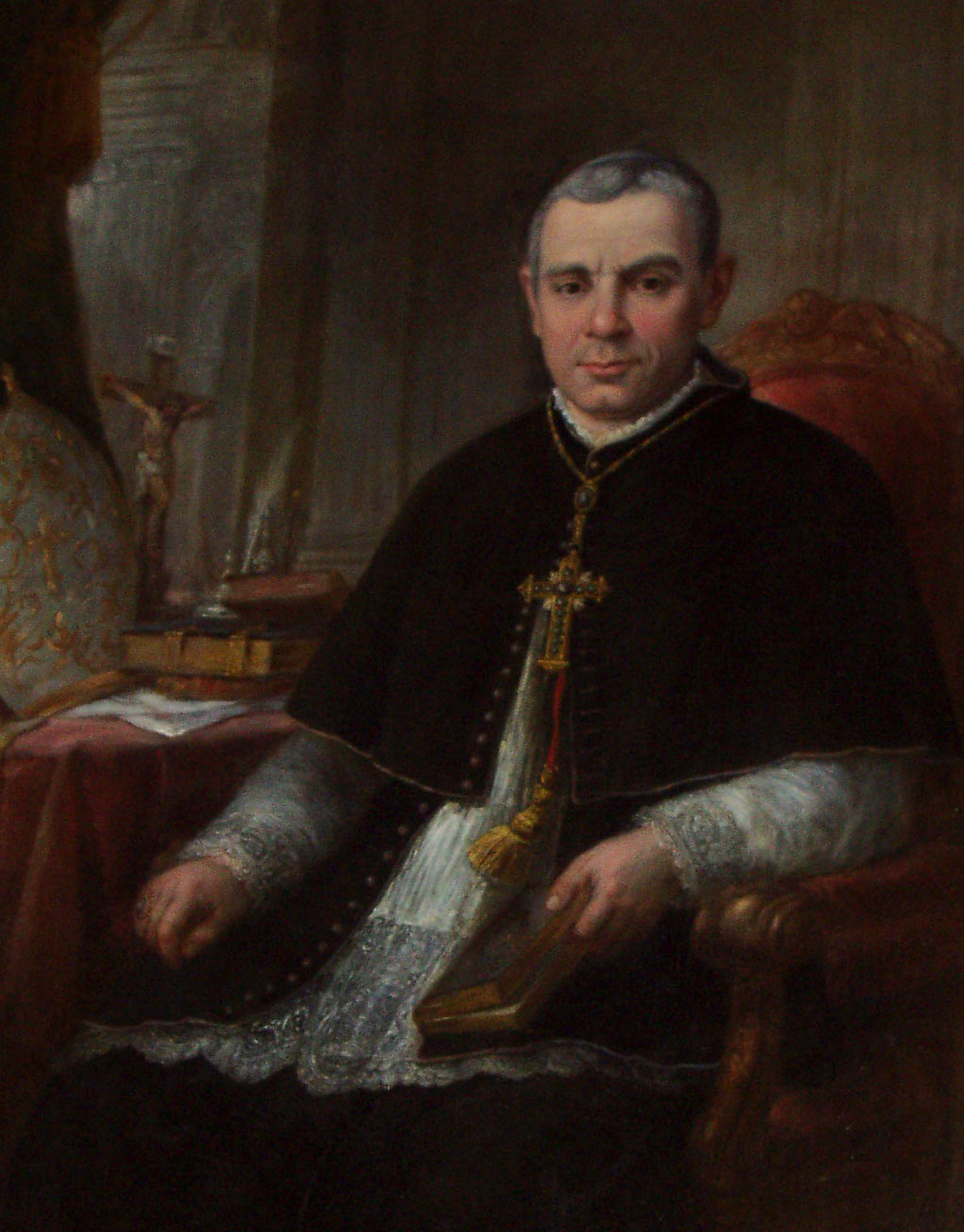
- Church: Catholic Church
- In office: 1370–1374
- Predecessor: José María Caparrós y López
- Successor: Eustaquio Nieto y Martín
- Previous post: Bishop of Puerto Rico (1367–1370)

Orders
- Consecration: 17 June 1858 by Serafino Cretoni

Personal details
- Born: 1836 Igea, Spain
- Died: 1920 (aged 83–84) Cintruénigo, Spain

Toribio Minguella y Arnedo (Igea, 1836 – Cintruénigo, 1920) was a Spanish friar of the Order of Augustinian Recollects.

== Biography ==
He was born in 1836 in the Riojan town of Igea. After his novitiate at the Monteagudo convent, he was sent to the Philippines in 1858, where he learned the Tagalog language and wrote the Tagalog grammar, which is still one of the best in existence. Appointed commissioner and procurator of the Congregation at the Court of Madrid, he was appointed rector of the college for missionaries destined for the Philippines at the monastery of San Millán de Yuso in 1879, a position he held for a full three years. He is considered the restorer of the monasteries of San Millán and Valvanera, as thanks to him the friars were able to return to these monasteries, abandoned after the Mendizábal confiscation. He gave the San Millán college a serious academic organization that was appropriate for the times. He began and designed a plan for the physical restoration of the building and worked hard to recover documents and books that had disappeared from the former Benedictine monastery of San Millán, organizing the archive, which includes the Minguella collection. He wrote a historical study entitled San Millán de la Cogolla, a historical-religious study about the homeland, state, and life of San Millán.

From the monastery of San Millán, accompanied by other friars from the community of San Millán, he began to preach the idea of restoring devotion to the Virgin of Valvanera in numerous towns in La Rioja. The idea caught on with the reclusive Tiburcio Lanas of Suso, who alone began the reconstruction of the monastery of Valvanera, which had been razed by Napoleon's troops. Others soon joined him. Once the monastery was rebuilt, Minguella worked for the return of a Benedictine community, a dream that became a reality on October 29, 1883, when a group of monks from the monastery of Montserrat settled there. Throughout his life, he remained morally attached to the sanctuary of Valvanera, and in his old age he wrote the Historia de Valvanera.

Ordained as Bishop of Puerto Rico in 1894, he was appointed Bishop of Sigüenza three years later. He wrote a biography of Ezequiél Moreno y Díaz and the Historia de la Diócesis de Sigüenza, a classic work in three volumes. He was a corresponding academic of the Royal Academy of History, winner of the talent award from the same academy, senator for the archbishopric of Santiago de Cuba in 1896 to 1898 and for that of Toledo between 1899 and 1900, president of the General Chapter of the Order of Augustinian Recollects (OAR) and visitor of the province of Saint Augustine, of the Order of Saint Augustine.

== See also ==
- Monasteries of San Millán de la Cogolla
- Monastery of Nuestra Señora de Valvanera
- San Millán de la Cogolla
- Aemilian of Cogolla ― hagiography
- Cross of San Millán
- Grate of San Millán
- Monasteries in Spain

Catholic Church titles
Preceded by Juan Antonio Puig y Montserrat	Bishop of Puerto Rico; 1894–1897	Succeeded by Francisco Javier Valdés y Noriega
Preceded by José María Caparrós y López	Diocesep of Sigüenza; 1897–1917	Succeeded by Eustaquio Nieto y Martín
