= William Jones (bishop of Puerto Rico) =

American Catholic bishop

The Most Reverend William A. Jones OSA
- Bishop of Puerto Rico
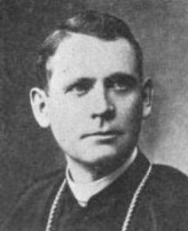
- Church: Latin Church
- Appointed: January 12, 1907
- In office: February 24, 1907 – February 17, 1921
- Predecessor: James Blenk
- Successor: Jorge José Caruana

Orders
- Ordination: March 15, 1890
- Consecration: February 24, 1907 by Giuseppe Aversa

Personal details
- Born: July 21, 1865 Cambridge, New York, US
- Died: February 17, 1921 (aged 55) San Juan, Puerto Rico

William Ambrose Jones OSA (July 21, 1865 – February 17, 1921) was a bishop of the Catholic Church born in the United States. He served as Bishop of Puerto Rico from 1907 to 1921.

== Biography ==
Born in Cambridge, New York, William Jones was ordained a priest for the Augustinian order on March 15, 1890. On January 12, 1907, Pope Pius X appointed him as the Bishop of Puerto Rico. He was consecrated a bishop by Archbishop Giuseppe Aversa, the Apostolic Delegate to Cuba, on February 24, 1907. The principal co-consecrators were Bishops Pedro Ladislao González y Estrada of San Cristóbal de la Habana and Antonio Aurelio Torres y Sanz of Cienfuegos. He arrived in Puerto Rico on March 16, 1907.

Jones continued to serve as the diocesan bishop until his death on February 17, 1921, at the age of 55. His remains were transferred to San Juan Cathedral, in Puerto Rico.
