= Juan Bautista de Zengotita Bengoa =

Juan Bautista de Zengotita Bengoa O. de M. (September 13, 1735 – November 1, 1802) was the Roman Catholic bishop of San Juan, Puerto Rico, from 1795 to 1802. During his episcopacy the British invaded Puerto Rico, and he provided what assistance he could, including personal funds.

Juan Bautista de Zengotita Bengoa was born in Berriz, Spain on September 13, 1735. In September 1749, he was professed as a member of the Order of Our Lady of Mercy.

He was reported to have traveled throughout his diocese, difficult in a time of poor transportation, and was involved in the founding of many churches as well as initial planning of a new seminary. He was born in the province of Biscay, in the parish of Berriz. He was a member of the order of Our Lady of the Merced when he was presented by King Charles IV to be the Bishop of Puerto Rico. He was elected and confirmed by Pope Pius VI on June 1, 1795, and took possession of the diocese when he arrived to Puerto Rico on March 30, 1796. He died on November 1, 1802, and initially his remains were in the cathedral of San Juan, until they were transferred in 1810 to the Chapel of St. Peter Nolasco.

== External links and additional sources ==
- Cheney, David M. "Archdiocese of San Juan de Puerto Rico". Catholic-Hierarchy.org. (for Chronology of Bishops) ^{[self-published]}
- Chow, Gabriel. "Metropolitan Archdiocese of San Juan de Puerto Rico". GCatholic.org. (for Chronology of Bishops) ^{[self-published]}
