= Academia San José =

Location
- Guaynabo; Puerto Rico
- Coordinates: 18.404383°N 66.112758°W

Information
- School type: Christian
- Established: 1950
- Closed: 2021
- Principal: Emma Morales
- Grades: K-12
- Website: academiasanjosepr.com

Academia San José High School was a Christian school, located in Villa Caparra, Puerto Rico. The school was officially shut down in May 2021 after years of financial issues.

== Elementary school ==
The Academia San José Elemental was also part of the Academia San José, and also a Catholic school, in Villa Caparra, Puerto Rico. The Elementary School offered many activities for its students.

== High school ==
The Academia San Jose High School was the first of the two schools built. It offered a wide variety of electives, courses, AP courses, activities, and more.
