= Miguel Rodriguez Rodriguez =

- Bishop Emeritus of Arecibo
- Church: Roman Catholicism
- See: Roman Catholic Diocese of Arecibo
- In office: 1974 — 1990

Orders
- Ordination: June 22, 1958
- Consecration: March 23, 1974 by Luis Aponte Martinez, Alfredo Méndez-Gonzalez, and Edward John Harper

Personal details
- Born: April 18, 1931; Mayagüez, Puerto Rico
- Died: August 13, 2001 (aged 70); Aguadilla, Puerto Rico
- Buried: Catedral de San Felipe Apostol in Arecibo, Puerto Rico
- Coat of arms

Miguel Rodriguez Rodriguez, C.Ss.R. (April 18, 1931 – August 31, 2001) was a Puerto Rican Roman Catholic bishop.

Rodriguez was ordained to the priesthood in 1958. In 1974, he was appointed bishop of the Roman Catholic Diocese of Arecibo, Puerto Rico and resigned in 1990.

== Episcopal succession ==
Catholic Church titles
Preceded by Alfredo Méndez-Gonzalez	Bishop of Arecibo; 1974—1990	Succeeded by Iñaki Mallona Txertudi
