= Colegio María Auxiliadora =

Catholic pre K–12 school in Carolina, Puerto Rico

Coordinates: 18°23′35″N 65°57′35″W

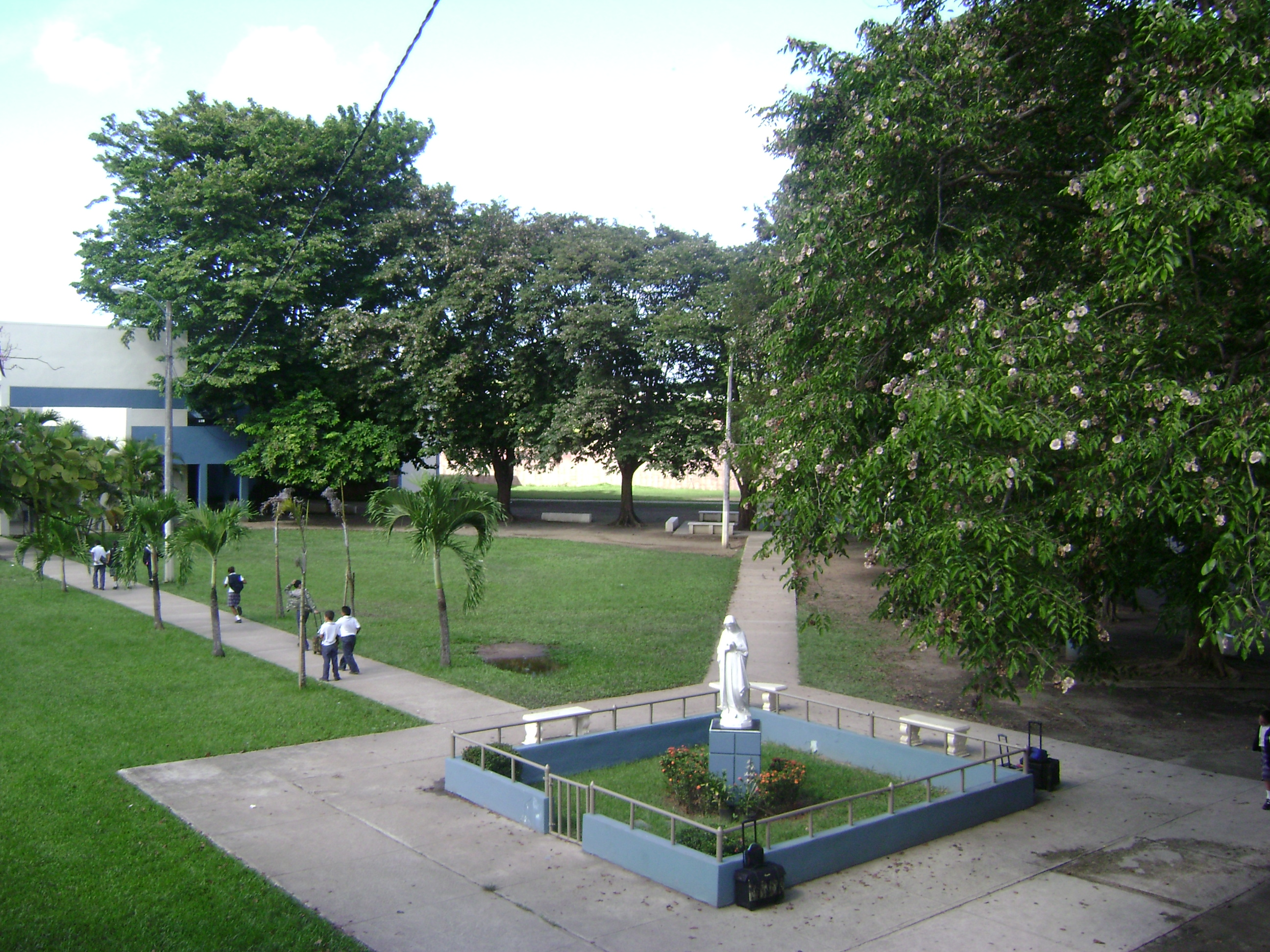
- Carolina; Puerto Rico

Information
- Religious affiliation(s): Latin Church
- Authority: Archdiocese of San Juan de Puerto Rico
- Grades: Pre-K–12

Colegio María Auxiliadora ("Mary Help of Christians") located in Carolina, Puerto Rico, is a co-educational Catholic school that belongs to the school system of the Archdiocese of San Juan de Puerto Rico. This institution offers courses from pre-kindergarten to the twelfth grade.

== History ==
Colegio Maria Auxiliadora was founded in 1960 by the Order of Salesians Sisters. His first classrooms were adjacent to the San Fernando Carolina parish and in 1967 acquired is current land. The parish priests then were Ángel Fernández, and Monsignor Baudilio Merino. In 1979, the school became part of the Archdiocese of San Juan de Puerto Rico.

=== 2020 Coronavirus Pandemic ===
During the COVID-19 pandemic, a parish priest was one of the first to test positive for the virus. This forced a quarantine of the school.

== Mission ==
The goal of Colegio Maria Auxiliadora is to educate and evangelize, and to achieve the full development of the student in all aspects: intellectual, spiritual, physical and moral.

== Philosophy ==
Considers the child as a unique being and individual whose value and dignity are guaranteed by a vision Christ-centric and believes that the educational process must provide to the students the tools for an authentic and healthy Christian growth and moral, intellectual, emotional, physical and social family.

== Clubs ==
- National Honor Society
- Students Council
- Math Club
- Library Club
- Technology Club
- Environmental Club

== Sports ==
- Basketball
- Baseball
- Table Tennis
- Volleyball
- Softball
- Soccer
- Track and field

== Notable alumni ==
- Dorimar Morales, winner of more than 70 awards for her academic research.
- Ivan Dariel Ortiz, creator of the film Héroes de Otra Patria
- Tito Ortos Guitérrez, famous international dancer .
- Pedro Cabiya, writer.
