= Rafael Grovas Felix =

Puerto Rican Catholic prelate (1905–1991)

- Bishop of Caguas
- Church: Catholic
- Archdiocese: San Juan
- Diocese: Caguas
- Appointed: January 19, 1965
- Installed: March 2, 1965
- Retired: February 12, 1981
- Predecessor: First bishop
- Successor: Enrique Manuel Hernández Rivera

Orders
- Ordination: April 7, 1928 by George J. Caruana
- Consecration: March 2, 1965 by José Humberto Quintero Parra, Edward John Harper and Alfredo Méndez-Gonzalez

Personal details
- Born: November 29, 1905 Santurce, Puerto Rico
- Died: September 9, 1991 (aged 85) Gurabo, Puerto Rico
- Buried: Catedral Dulce Nombre de Jesús in Caguas, Puerto Rico

Rafael Grovas Felix (November 29, 1905 – September 9, 1991) was a Catholic prelate who was the bishop of the Diocese of Caguas in Puerto Rico from 1965 to 1981.

Ordained to the priesthood in 1928, Grovas Felix was named bishop of the Diocese of Caguas, Puerto Rico in 1965, and retired in 1981.

== Episcopal succession ==
Catholic Church titles
| New title | Bishop of Caguas; 1965–1981 | Succeeded by Enrique Manuel Hernández Rivera |
