= Edward John Harper =

20th-century Catholic Bishop of St. Thomas

The Most Reverend Edward J. Harper CSsR
- Bishop of Saint Thomas
- Province: Washington
- Diocese: Saint Thomas
- Appointed: April 20, 1977
- Term ended: October 16, 1985
- Successor: Sean P. O'Malley
- Previous posts: Apostolic Prefect of the Territorial Prelature of the Virgin Islands (1960–1977), Titular Bishop of Heraclea Pontica (1960–1977)

Orders
- Ordination: June 18, 1939
- Consecration: October 6, 1960 by Bryan J. McEntegart

Personal details
- Born: July 23, 1910 New York City, US
- Died: December 2, 1990 (aged 80)
- Education: Mount St. Alphonsus Seminary

Edward John Harper CSsR (July 23, 1910 — December 2, 1990) was an American member of the Congregation of the Most Holy Redeemer (more commonly known as the Redemptorists) and a prelate of the Roman Catholic Church. He was the first Bishop of Saint Thomas in the Virgin Islands, serving in that office from 1977 to 1985.

== Life ==
Harper was born on July 23, 1910, in the Bay Ridge neighborhood of Brooklyn, New York. He initially began a career as an accountant, but he later felt called to become a missionary and entered the Redemptorists in 1933, making his temporary profession of religious vows as a member of the congregation on August 2 of the following year. He was ordained a priest on June 18, 1939. He then fulfilled assignments in Puerto Rico, Santo Domingo, and the Virgin Islands.

On July 23, 1960, Harper was appointed by Pope John XXIII as the first Apostolic Prefect of the newly erected Apostolic Prelature of the Virgin Islands and Titular Bishop of Heraclea Pontica. He received his episcopal consecration on the following October 6 from Bryan J. McEntegart, Bishop of Brooklyn, with Bishops William Tibertus McCarty and James Edward McManus serving as co-consecrators, at Our Lady of Perpetual Help Church in Brooklyn.

Upon the elevation of his prelature to the Diocese of Saint Thomas, Harper was named its first bishop on April 20, 1977. He retired on October 16, 1985. He died on December 2, 1990, at the age of 80 years.

Catholic Church titles
New title	Bishop of Saint Thomas; 1977–1985	Succeeded by Seán Patrick O'Malley
