= Roberto González Nieves =

American Catholic archbishop (born 1950)

His Excellency, The Most Reverend Roberto Octavio González Nieves O.F.M.
- Archbishop Emeritus of San Juan
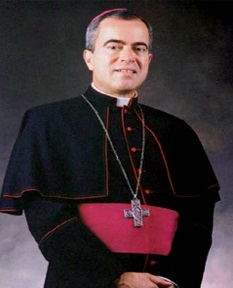
- Archdiocese: Archdiocese of San Juan
- Appointed: March 26, 1999
- Installed: May 8, 1999
- Retired: August 6, 2026
- Predecessor: Luis Aponte Martínez
- Successor: Eusebio Ramos Morales
- Previous posts: Bishop of Corpus Christi (1997-1999); Coadjutor Bishop of Corpus Christi (1995-1997); Auxiliary Bishop of Boston and Titular Bishop of Ursona (1988-1995)

Orders
- Ordination: May 8, 1977 by Lorenzo Michele Joseph Graziano
- Consecration: October 3, 1988 by Bernard Francis Law, John O'Connor, and Luis Aponte Martinez

Personal details
- Born: June 2, 1950 (age 76) Elizabeth, New Jersey, US
- Denomination: Roman Catholic
- Education: Siena College; Washington Theological Union; Fordham University
- Motto: Vita per Jesum (Life through Jesus)

Styles of Roberto Octavio Gonzalez Nieves
- Reference style: His Excellency; The Most Reverend
- Spoken style: Your Excellency
- Religious style: Archbishop

Roberto Octavio González Nieves OFM (born June 2, 1950) is an American Catholic prelate who served as Archbishop of San Juan de Puerto Rico from 1999 to 2026. He is a member of the Order of Friars Minor.

González previously served as an auxiliary bishop of the Archdiocese of Boston from 1988 to 1995, and as Bishop of Corpus Christi from 1997 to 1999 after two years as coadjutor. He spent his first decade as a priest serving parishes in the Bronx, New York City.

== Biography ==
=== Early life and education ===
Roberto González was born in Elizabeth, New Jersey, on June 2, 1950, to Puerto Rican parents. His father was a graduate of Seton Hall. He moved with his family to San Juan and grew up in a parish staffed by Franciscans. He has described himself as "a child of the Puerto Rican diaspora, my emotional and primary homeland". From 1957 to 1964 he attended Academia Santa Monica in Santurce, a district of San Juan, and then began his priestly formation at St. Joseph Seraphic Minor Seminary in Callicoon, New York, from 1964 to 1968. He graduated from Siena College in Loudonville, New York, in 1973 with a B.A. in English.

González was accepted as a candidate for the Franciscans at Christ House in Lafayette, New Jersey, in 1970 and he entered the novitiate of the Order at St. Francis Friary in Brookline, Massachusetts, in 1971. González professed his first vows on 25 August 1974 and his solemn vows on 21 August 1976.

González earned a Master of Sacred Theology degree in 1977 from the Washington Theological Coalition in Silver Spring, Maryland. He earned a master's degree in 1978 and then his doctorate in 1984, both in sociology, at Fordham University in New York City. His thesis was Ecological, Ethnic and Cultural Factors of Church Practice in an Urban Roman Catholic Church.

=== Priest ===
On May 8, 1977, González was ordained a priest for the Franciscans by Lorenzo Graziano, Bishop Emeritus of San Miguel in El Salvador, himself a Franciscan. Beginning in 1982, González served at St. Pius V Parish and then from 1986 to 1988 at Holy Cross Parish, both in the Bronx. In 1987, New York City Mayor Ed Koch included González as one of his six appointees to the New York City Police Review Panel.

== Episcopal Career ==
=== Auxiliary Bishop of Boston ===
On July 19, 1988, Pope John Paul II appointed González an auxiliary bishop of the Archdiocese of Boston and titular bishop of Ursona. He received his episcopal consecration in Boston on October 3, 1988, from Cardinal Bernard Law, with two cardinals as co-consecrators: John O'Connor of New York and Luis Aponte Martínez of San Juan.

=== Bishop of Corpus Christi ===
On May 16, 1995, González was appointed coadjutor bishop of the Diocese of Corpus Christi in Texas by John Paul II. On April 1, 1997, he succeeded as bishop of the diocese upon the retirement of Bishop René Gracida.

He served on two committees of the United States Conference of Catholic Bishops: Hispanic Affairs and the Church in Latin America.

=== Archbishop of San Juan ===
On March 26, 1999, González was appointed archbishop of the Archdiocese of San Juan by John Paul II. He was installed as archbishop on May 8, 1999. Attendees included the mayor of San Juan, Sila Calderón and former Governor Carlos Romero Barceló. González' retiring predecessor, Cardinal Luis Aponte Martínez, observed that the ceremony marked the first time that a Puerto Rican archbishop handed the see over to another Puerto Rican archbishop.

Almost immediately, González raised his profile across the island. In September 1999, he joined Reverend Jesse Jackson at an interfaith prayer service in East Harlem in New York City, where he preached in Spanish on themes of Puerto Rican nationalism and anti-colonialism. He distanced himself from any specific position on the legal status of Puerto Rico, but said he favored institutions that "foster the national identity of the Puerto Rican people". He has articulated outspoken and often controversial views, particularly in defense of the US Navy-Vieques protests and in his denunciation of homosexuality, among other things.

González has proclaimed his pride in being Puerto Rican, has asked the U.S. Government to work hard to preserve the national identity of Puerto Ricans, and criticized political corruption in Puerto Rico.

During the spring of 2006, along with several Protestant leaders, he was instrumental in persuading Puerto Rican Governor Aníbal Acevedo Vilá, Senate President Kenneth McClintock, and House Speaker José Aponte Hernández to resolve Puerto Rico's fiscal crisis, which had sparked a two-week-long government shutdown.

On August 6, 2026, Pope Leo XIV accepted his resignation after reaching the retirement age of 75.

Apostolic visitation

In 2011, González was the target of charges that he was mismanaging the archdiocese. The Congregation for the Clergy, with the backing of the Congregation for Bishops, appointed an apostolic visitor, Archbishop Antonio Arregui Yarza of Guayaquil in Ecuador, to conduct an investigation, which he began on October 25. Archbishop Jozef Wesolowski, was eventually identified as Gonzalez' "principal and most insistent accuser". Since becoming apostolic delegate to Puerto Rico in 2008, he had clashed repeatedly with González, particularly disturbed, according to La Stampa, by González' Puerto Rican advocacy. He submitted confidential reports that included claims González had mishandled cases of priests accused of sexual abuse and sold Catholic school property without authorization. González indicated he would contest, in particular, any claim that he had not properly dealt with charges of sexual abuse on the part of priests.

As González awaited the results of the investigation, the bishops of Puerto Rico demonstrated their confidence in him by electing him the president of their conference in December 2012. That same month he refused when pressured to resign by Vatican officials, responding instead with a lengthy rebuttal in February 2013. When details of the standoff became public, almost a hundred Catholic organizations formed a coalition to demonstrate their solidarity with González.

The Vatican cleared González of all the charges against him in June 2013. In August, Wesolowski was removed as apostolic delegate and the failure of the Vatican to credit his claims against González was thought to explain his departure. Wesolowski was in fact removed because he was suspected of sexually abusing minors. After a canonical trial he was laicized in June 2014.

Altar of the Homeland

In 2013, he succeeded in arranging for the remains of Puerto Rican "founding father" Ramón Power y Giralt (1775–1813) to be transferred from Spain to Puerto Rico. He worked with the Bishop of Cádiz and Ceuta to accomplish this project which had long been frustrated by political infighting and bureaucratic hurdles, despite the fact that Power is recognized as a hero by all of Puerto Rico's political factions. González had prepared a mausoleum chapel alongside the Cathedral of San Juan Bautista to receive the remains of Power and of Juan Alejo de Arizmendi, the first Puerto Rican bishop of San Juan, but in December 2022 Cardinal Tarcisio Bertone, the Holy See's Secretary of State, had ordered González not to proceed with the interments and to stop calling the chapel, which Gonzalez inaugurated in 2011, the altar de la patria.

Power's remains arrived in San Juan on April 6, 2013; González called the transfer "a boost to our identity" and a moment of clarification for Puerto Rico. By then González could count on support from his friend, the newly elected Pope Francis, and on May 18 the Congregation for Divine Worship told him it had no objection to moving Power's remains into the cathedral. On June 2, González decreed the establishment of the "Chapel of the Holy Christ of the entire Puerto Rican nation" to serve as "a privileged place dedicated to prayer for Puerto Rico, its nation, including its diaspora and all its inhabitants". On June 10, 2013, the 200th anniversary of Power's death in Cádiz, his remains and those of Arizmendi were reinterred in the chapel. González said: "If this Altar of the Homeland leads us to erect an Altar of the Homeland in our hearts, then all this effort has been worth it."

Other activities

Since 2013, filmmaker Richard Rossi has promoted the cause for sainthood of baseball player Roberto Clemente, a process that to begin in the Archdiocese of San Juan where Clemente died. Despite periodic false reports of action on the part of the Vatican or Pope Francis, the archdiocese has not confirmed that the process has begun. Rossi has said that Gonzalez "has been less passionate than Pope Francis" about Clemente's chances, but the Washington Post was unable as of 2017 to establish that the pope is aware of the case. Gonzalez has not made his views known.

He attend both sessions of the Synod of Bishops on the Family as president of the Episcopal Conference of Puerto Rico in October 2014 and October 2015. At the 2015 meeting, he described the current practice of divorced and remarried Catholics approaching the priest with their arms crossed to receive a blessing and called it "a manifestation of the desire of sacramental communion" in which "they humble themselves before the community by making clear to all their illegal status; as if to say: Mea culpa, mea culpa, mea maxima culpa!" He suggested a pastoral approach that would guide them on a "penitential journey", questioned the requirement that a spouse abandon their partner in an unsanctioned marriage, and underscored "the efficacy of the penitential sacrament as a sacrament of conversion".

A close ally of Chicago's Cardinal Blase Cupich, González Nieves was reported as being behind the removal of Arecibo bishop Daniel Fernández Torres over a statement he had issued on coronavirus vaccines, as well as his decision not to send seminarians to the island's inter diocesan seminary and disagreements over a 2018 lawsuit involving the archdiocese.

=== Honors ===
González has received honorary doctorates from St. Bonaventure University (New York), Universidad Central de Bayamón (Puerto Rico), Siena College (New York), and the Graduate Theological Foundation (Puerto Rico). Regis College in Massachusetts awarded him its Presidential Medal in 2000. Fordham awarded him its Sapientia et Doctrina award in recognition of his contributions to Hispanic ministry in 2009.

== See also ==
- Catholic Church hierarchy
- Catholic Church in the United States
- Historical list of the Catholic bishops of Puerto Rico
- Historical list of the Catholic bishops of the United States
- List of Catholic bishops of the United States
- Lists of patriarchs, archbishops, and bishops

Catholic Church titles
Preceded by –	Auxiliary Bishop of Boston; 1988–1995	Succeeded by –
Preceded by –	Coadjutor Bishop of Corpus Christi; 1995–1997	Succeeded by –
Preceded by René Henry Gracida	Bishop of Corpus Christi; 1997–1999	Succeeded by Edmond Carmody
Preceded by Luis Aponte Martínez	Archbishop of San Juan; 1999–2026	Succeeded by Eusebio Ramos Morales
