= Luis Aponte Martínez =

Puerto Rican Catholic cardinal

His Eminence Luis Aponte Martínez
- Cardinal, Archbishop Emeritus of San Juan
- Archdiocese: San Juan
- Installed: January 15, 1965
- Term ended: March 26, 1999
- Predecessor: James Peter Davis
- Successor: Roberto González Nieves
- Other post: Cardinal-Priest of Santa Maria Madre della Provvidenza a Monte
- Previous posts: Bishop of Ponce (1963‍–‍1964)

Orders
- Ordination: April 10, 1950 by James Edward McManus
- Consecration: October 12, 1960 by Francis Spellman
- Created cardinal: March 5, 1973 by Paul VI
- Rank: Cardinal-Priest

Personal details
- Born: August 4, 1922 Lajas, Puerto Rico
- Died: April 10, 2012 (aged 89) San Juan, Puerto Rico
- Buried: Cathedral of San Juan Bautista, San Juan, Puerto Rico
- Motto: In virtute Dei
- Coat of arms: Luis Aponte Martínez's coat of arms

Ordination history of Luis Aponte Martínez
History
Priestly ordination
- Ordained by: James Edward McManus CSsR (Ponce)
Episcopal consecration
- Consecrated by: Francis Cardinal Spellman (New York)
Cardinalate
- Elevated by: Pope Paul VI
Episcopal succession
Bishops consecrated by Luis Aponte Martínez as principal consecrator
- Miguel Rodriguez Rodriguez: March 23, 1974
- Ulises Aurelio Casiano Vargas: April 30, 1976
- Héctor Manuel Rivera Pérez: August 17, 1979
- Enrique Manuel Hernández Rivera: August 17, 1979
- Hermín Negrón Santana: September 7, 1981
- Ruben Antonio González Medina: February 4, 2001

Luis Aponte Martínez (August 4, 1922 – April 10, 2012) was a Puerto Rican Catholic prelate who served as Archbishop of San Juan from 1965 to 1999. He is the only Puerto Rican to have been named a cardinal of the Catholic Church. He participated as an elector in the two conclaves of 1978, which elected Popes John Paul I and John Paul II.

== Early life and education ==
Aponte Martínez was born in the town of Lajas, Puerto Rico, the son of Santiago Evangelista Aponte and Rosa María Martínez.

Aponte came from a large family, the eighth of 18 children. He served as an altar boy for many years in his hometown. Aponte studied in the Seminary of San Ildefonso in San Juan; from there he went to Boston, Massachusetts, where he studied at Saint John's Seminary. He also attended Boston College and earned his doctorate from the seminary at Saint Leo University in Florida.

== Priesthood and episcopacy ==
Aponte was ordained a priest of the Diocese of Ponce in San German, Puerto Rico, on April 10, 1950, by James Edward McManus, the Bishop of Ponce. Between 1950 and 1955, he served as a pastor in various towns in the diocese. In 1955 he served as secretary to the bishop, as well as superintendent of Catholic schools for the diocese. In 1957, he once again served as a pastor and also served as chaplain in the Puerto Rico National Guard, until his appointment in 1957 as chancellor of the Pontifical Catholic University of Puerto Rico in Ponce.

On October 12, 1960, Aponte Martinez became only the second native-born Puerto Rican in nearly 150 years (after Juan Alejo de Arizmendi) to be consecrated as a bishop, being appointed auxiliary bishop in the Diocese of Ponce by Pope John XXIII, assigned as the titular bishop of Lares. On April 16, 1963, Aponte Martinez was appointed coadjutor bishop of Ponce by Pope John, to which office he succeeded on November 18, 1963, and was installed on the following February 22. On November 4, 1964, he was appointed by Pope Paul VI as the Archbishop of San Juan.

== Cardinal ==
Styles of Luis Aponte Martínez
- Reference style: His Eminence
- Spoken style: Your Eminence
- Informal style: Cardinal
- See: San Juan (Emeritus)

On March 5, 1973, Pope Paul VI made Aponte Martínez the first-ever Puerto Rican cardinal, specifically the cardinal-priest of Santa Maria della Provvidenza a Monteverde.

He held the position of president of the board of directors of the Catholic University of Puerto Rico. He was president of the Puerto Rican Episcopal Conference and also of the Latin American Episcopal Conference (CELAM).

In 1984, Aponte helped coordinate and was among the many dignitaries who greeted Pope John Paul II, upon his visit to Puerto Rico.

Cardinal Aponte was actively involved in some of the church's major acquisitions in Puerto Rico. Among these were a television and radio station and a weekly publication called El Visitante (The Visitor). This served to spread the church's point of view all over the island.

Cardinal Aponte retired as Archbishop of San Juan in May 1999, after almost 30 years as archbishop. He participated in the preparation for the Papal Conclave of 2005, but was unable to vote, since he was 82 at the time of the conclave, past the canonical age of 80 for electors.

In 2006, he published his memoirs, Unde hoc mihi.

== Death ==
Aponte died on April 10, 2012, at the Hospital Español de Auxilio Mutuo in San Juan after a long illness. He was 89. Puerto Rican Governor Luis Fortuno declared five days of official mourning for the cardinal, who died on the 62nd anniversary of his priestly ordination.

His body was taken to churches in Lajas, San German, Ponce and Santurce, to allow local Catholics to pay their respects, and a Mass of the Resurrection took place on April 16 in the Cathedral of San Juan Bautista in Old San Juan. Cardinal Carlos Amigo Vallejo, retired archbishop of Seville, Spain, presided, with the Puerto Rican bishops and Archbishop Josef Wesolowski, papal nuncio to the Dominican Republic and apostolic delegate to Puerto Rico, concelebrating.

== See also ==
- List of Puerto Ricans
- Historical list of the Catholic bishops of Puerto Rico

Catholic Church titles
| Preceded by James Peter Davis | Archbishop of San Juan; 1964–1999 | Succeeded by Roberto González Nieves OFM |
| Preceded by James Edward McManus | Bishop of Ponce; 1963–1964 | Succeeded by Juan Fremiot Torres Oliver |
| Preceded by – | Coadjutor Bishop of Ponce; 1963–1963 | Succeeded by – |
| Preceded by – | Auxiliary Bishop of Ponce; 1960–1963 | Succeeded by – |
