= List of churches in the Diocese of Arecibo =

This is a list of current and former Roman Catholic churches in the Diocese of Arecibo, one of the suffragan dioceses of the Archdiocese of San Juan de Puerto Rico. The jurisdiction of this diocese comprises the Puerto Rican municipalities of Arecibo, Barceloneta, Camuy, Ciales, Corozal, Florida, Hatillo, Isabela, Lares, Manatí, Morovis, Orocovis, Quebradillas, Utuado, Vega Alta and Vega Baja.

The mother church of the diocese is the Arecibo Cathedral, dedicated to Philip the Apostle.

== Municipality of Arecibo ==
Church name	Image	Location	Date est.	Description/notes
Cristo Rey		Dominguito	1967	
Inmaculada Concepción		Arenalejos		
Inmaculada Concepción		Hato Abajo		
Inmaculada Concepción		Sabana Hoyos		
Inmaculado Corazón de María		Sabana Hoyos		
La Milagrosa		Hato Abajo		
La Milagrosa		Miraflores	1973	
Nuestra Señora de Fátima		Sabana Hoyos	1966	
Nuestra Señora de la Divina Providencia		Hato Arriba		
Nuestra Señora de la Esperanza		Esperanza	1986	
Nuestra Señora del Carmen		Factor		
Nuestra Señora del Carmen		Hato Abajo	1961	
Nuestra Señora del Carmen		Sabana Hoyos		
Nuestra Señora La Dolorosa		Hato Abajo		
Sagrada Familia		Islote	1972	
Sagrado Corazón		Arecibo Pueblo	1961	
San Antonio de Padua		Hato Viejo		
San Felipe Apóstol		Arecibo Pueblo	1846	Cathedral and main town church of Arecibo, established at the location of previous existing churches, the first one having been built sometime between 1556 and 1616.
San Francisco de Asís		Garrochales		
San José		Hato Viejo		
San José Obrero		Hato Abajo		
San Juan Apóstol		Islote		
San Juan Bosco		Hato Abajo	1971	
San Martín de Porres		Hato Abajo	1973	
San Martín de Porres		Tanamá		
Santa Ana		Santana	1967	
Santa María Reina		Islote		
Santa Teresita del Niño Jesús		Hato Abajo	1980	
Señor de los Milagros		Factor		

== Municipality of Barceloneta ==
Church name	Image	Location	Date est.	Description/notes
Nuestra Señora de Fátima		Garrochales		
Nuestra Señora de la Victoria		Florida Afuera		
Nuestra Señora del Carmen		Barceloneta Pueblo	1881	Main town church of Barceloneta. It has the distinction of being one of the main town parishes in the island to not be located in the main town square, as it was re-established a different location in 1910. The current church building dates to 1930.
Santa María del Mar		Punta Palmas		

== Municipality of Camuy ==
Church name	Image	Location	Date est.	Description/notes
Espíritu Santo		Abra Honda		
Inmaculada Concepción		Zanja		
La Milagrosa		Piedra Gorda		
La Milagrosa		Puente		
Nuestra Señora de la Monserrate		Cibao		
Nuestra Señora de la Monserrate		Yeguada		
Nuestra Señora del Perpetuo Socorro		Yeguada		
Nuestra Señora del Rosario		Membrillo		
Sagrado Corazón		Puertos		
Sagrado Corazón de Jesús		Puente		
San José		Camuy Pueblo	1797	Main town church of Camuy, established in accordance to the Law of the Indies in preparation for the founding of the city in 1807. Current church building dates to 1974.

== Municipality of Ciales ==
Church name	Image	Location	Date est.	Description/notes
Inmaculado Corazón de María		Cialitos		
Nuestra Señora, Madre del Redentor		Frontón	1988	
Nuestra Señora del Rosario		Ciales Pueblo	1820	Main town church of Ciales. The current church building dates to 1963.
San Ignacio		Pesas		

== Municipality of Corozal ==
Church name	Image	Location	Date est.	Description/notes
Cristo Rey		Magueyes		
Cristo Rey (and Perpetuo Socorro Chapel)		Cuchillas	1970	
Inmaculada Concepción		Padilla		
Nuestra Señora de Fátima		Maná		
Nuestra Señora de la Divina Providencia		Palmarito		
Nuestra Señora de los Siete Dolores		Padilla	1984	
Nuestra Señora del Carmen		Cibuco		
Perpetuo Socorro		Corozal Pueblo		
Sagrada Familia		Corozal Pueblo	1795	Main town church of Corozal, located in the Plaza Presidente Franklin Delano Roosevelt. The first structure was destroyed by Hurricane San Narciso in 1867, with the current church building dating to 1870.
San José		Abras		
San Martín de Porres		Padilla		
Santa Teresita		Dos Bocas		
Sanctuary of La Milagrosa		Palmarito	1964	Parochial Marian shrine.

== Municipality of Florida ==
Church name	Image	Location	Date est.	Description/notes
Nuestra Señora de la Merced		Florida Adentro	1884	Main town parish church of Florida, formerly a barrio of Barceloneta.

== Municipality of Hatillo ==
Church name	Image	Location	Date est.	Description/notes
Nuestra Señora de Guadalupe		Campo Alegre	1961	
Nuestra Señora del Carmen		Hatillo Pueblo	1879	Main town church of Hatillo, located across from Plaza José R. Millán.
Nuestra Señora del Perpetuo Socorro		Bayaney	1961	Diocesan Marian shrine and sanctuary.
Nuestra Señora del Perpetuo Socorro		Capáez		
San José		Naranjito		
Santa Rosa de Lima		Hatillo Pueblo		
Santa Rosa de Lima		Corcovado		
Schoenstatt Magnificat Shrine		Campo Alegre	1984	Schoenstatt Apostolic Movement sanctuary.

== Municipality of Isabela ==
Church name	Image	Location	Date est.	Description/notes
Los Santos Innocentes		Llanadas		
Nuestra Señora de La Monserrate		Arenales Bajos		
Nuestra Señora del Carmen		Llanadas		
San Antonio de Padua		Isabela Pueblo	1824	Current main town church of Isabela, located across from Plaza Manuel María Corchado y Juarbe. Current church building dates to 1835, with modifications made in 1924 after sustaining heavy damage during the 1918 earthquake.
San Antonio de Padua		Coto	1730	Former main town church of Isabela before the town was relocated in 1819 to its current location. The hermitage ruins are still preserved.
San Martín de Porres		Coto		
Santa Rosa de Lima		Guerrero		Served by Trinitarians.

== Municipality of Lares ==
Church name	Image	Location	Date est.	Description/notes
Nuestra Señora de la Medalla Milagrosa		Bartolo	1930	Main parish church of the poblado of Castañer.
San José		Lares Pueblo	1838	Main town church of Lares, located in Plaza de la Revolución. Established at the location of a former wooden rural hermitage in preparation to the foundation of the town in accordance to the Law of the Indies. The current structure dates to 1881 with modifications made in 1920.
Sagrada Familia de Nazaret		Buenos Aires		
San Judas Tadeo		Buenos Aires	1986	

== Municipality of Manatí ==
Church name	Image	Location	Date est.	Description/notes
El Salvador		Manatí Pueblo	1963	
Nuestra Señora de la Candelaria y San Matías Apóstol		Manatí Pueblo	1729	Main town church of Manatí, located across from Plaza Luis Muñoz Rivera. One of the oldest churches in the region.
Nuestra Señora de la Salud		Manatí Pueblo		
Nuestra Señora del Mar		Tierras Nuevas Saliente	1978	
Sagrada Familia		Coto Sur	1972	

== Municipality of Morovis ==
Church name	Image	Location	Date est.	Description/notes
Divino Niño de Praga		Fránquez		Parochial sanctuary.
La Medalla Milagrosa		Vaga		
La Milagrosa		Río Grande		
La Sagrada Familia		Unibón		
Nuestra Señora del Carmen		Morovis Norte		
Nuestra Señora del Carmen		Morovis Pueblo	1823	Main town church of Morovis, located across from Plaza Don Juan Evangelista Rivera. The current façade dates to 1955, with further remodeling made in 1961.
Nuestra Señora del Carmen		Pasto		
Nuestra Señora del Carmen		Perchas		
Nuestra Señora del Rosario		San Lorenzo		
Reina de la Paz		Cuchillas		
Sagrado Corazón		Cuchillas		
San José		Morovis Sur		
San Judas Tadeo		Vaga		
San Miguel Arcángel		Unibón		
San Pablo Apóstol Barahona		Barahona	1985	

== Municipality of Orocovis ==
Church name	Image	Location	Date est.	Description/notes
Divino Niño		Sabana		Served by the Congregation of Marian Fathers of the Immaculate Conception.
Nuestra Señora de Fátima		Saltos		
Nuestra Señora de Guadalupe		Barros		
Nuestra Señora de la Divina Providencia		Bauta Abajo		
Nuestra Señora de la Monserrate		Damián Abajo		
Nuestra Señora de los Dolores		Saltos		
Nuestra Señora del Perpetuo Socorro		Damián Arriba		
Nuestra Señora del Pilar		Damián Abajo		
Nuestra Señora del Rosario		Bauta Abajo		
Sagrado Corazón		Mata de Cañas		
San Juan Bautista		Orocovis Pueblo	1838	Main town church of Orocovis, located in the Plaza Juan Rivera de Santiago. The current building dates to the early 20th century as the first structure burned down in a 1875 fire.
San Juan Bosco		Gato		
Virgen del Carmen		Orocovis		

== Municipality of Quebradillas ==
Church name	Image	Location	Date est.	Description/notes
Nuestra Señora de Fátima		Guajataca		
Nuestra Señora de la Monserrate		San Antonio		
San Antonio de Padua		San Antonio		
San Miguel		San Antonio		
San Rafael		Quebradillas Pueblo	1823	Main town church of Quebradillas, located in the Plaza Luis Muñoz Rivera. The current church was built in 1950 after the original was heavily damaged during the 1918 earthquake.
Santa Cruz		Cacao		
Virgen del Perpetuo Socorro		Cocos		Diocesan Marian sanctuary.

== Municipality of Utuado ==
Church name	Image	Location	Date est.	Description/notes
Nuestra Señora de los Ángeles		Ángeles	1965	
Nuestra Señora de los Dolores		Caguana	1983	
San Martín de Porres		Arenas		
San Martín de Porres		Roncador		
San Miguel Arcángel		Utuado Pueblo	1872	Main town church of Utuado, located across from the main town square. It also serves a parochial school.

== Municipality of Vega Alta ==
Church name	Image	Location	Date est.	Description/notes
Inmaculada Concepción de María		Vega Alta Pueblo	1831	Main town church of Vega Alta, located across from Plaza Dr. Gilberto Concepción de Gracia.
Nuestra Señora del Carmen		Sabana	1971	Served by the Discalced Carmelites.
Nuestra Señora del Perpetuo Socorro		Cieneguetas		
Nuestra Señora del Perpetuo Socorro		Sabana	1975	
Sagrado Corazón de Jesús		Maricao		
Santa Ana		Espinosa	1967	

== Municipality of Vega Baja ==
Church name	Image	Location	Date est.	Description/notes
Nuestra Señora del Carmen		Puerto Nuevo	1976	Also hosts the Santuario del Cristo de los Milagros.
Nuestra Señora del Rosario		Vega Baja Pueblo	1860	Main town square of Vega Baja, located in the Plaza José Francisco Náter.
Nuestra Señora Madre de la Divina Providencia		Algarrobo	1970	
Nuestra Señora de la Medalla Milagrosa		Río Abajo		
Nuestra Señora de Lourdes		Pugnado Afuera	1984	
San José		Algarrobo		
San Juan Bautista		Quebrada Arenas		
San Martín de Porres		Pugnado Afuera	1967	
San Pedro Apóstol		Algarrobo		
Santa Rosa de Lima		Pugnado Afuera		
Santísima Trinidad		Almirante Sur	1973	
