= Episcopal Conference of Puerto Rico =

Conference Catholic of Bishops

The Puerto Rican Episcopal Conference (Spanish: Conferencia Episcopal Puertorriqueña) (CEP) is the episcopal conference of the Roman Catholic bishops of Puerto Rico, a territory of the United States.

== Dioceses and bishops ==
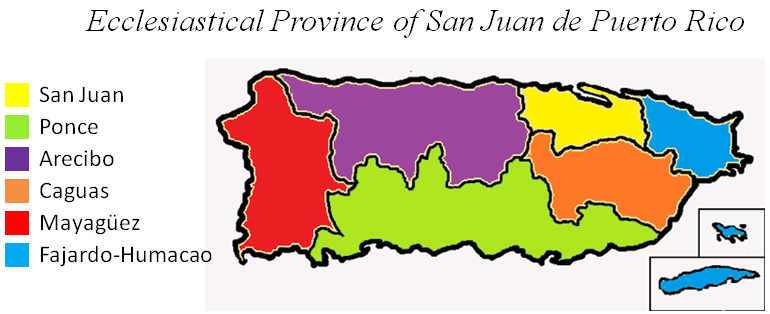
Ecclesiastical Province of San Juan de Puerto Rico

- Roman Catholic Archdiocese of San Juan de Puerto Rico (erected in 1511)
  - Roberto González Nieves, O.F.M., Archbishop of San Juan
- Roman Catholic Diocese of Arecibo (erected in 1960)
  - Alberto Arturo Figueroa Morales, Bishop of Arecibo
    - Daniel Fernández Torres, Bishop Emeritus of Arecibo
- Roman Catholic Diocese of Caguas (erected in 1964)
  - Eusebio Ramos Morales, Bishop of Caguas
    - Enrique Hernández Rivera, Bishop Emeritus of Caguas
- Roman Catholic Diocese of Fajardo-Humacao (erected in 2008)
  - Luis Miranda Rivera, O. Carm., Bishop of Fajardo-Humacao
- Roman Catholic Diocese of Mayagüez (erected in 1976)
  - Ángel Luis Ríos Matos, Bishop of Mayagüez
    - Álvaro Corrada del Río, S.J., Bishop Emeritus of Mayaguez
- Roman Catholic Diocese of Ponce (erected in 1924)
  - Ruben González Medina, C.M.F., Bishop of Ponce
    - Félix Lázaro Martinez, Sch. P., Bishop Emeritus of Ponce

== Presidents ==
See footnote

1. Cardinal Luis Aponte Martínez, Archbishop of San Juan (1966–1983; was created a cardinal on March 5, 1973)
2. Bishop Juan Torres Oliver, Bishop of Ponce (1983–1994)
3. Bishop Iñaki Mallona Txertudi, C.P., Bishop of Arecibo (1994–1997)
4. Bishop Ulises Aurelio Casiano Vargas, Bishop of Mayagüez (1997–2000)
5. Archbishop Roberto Octavio González Nieves, Archbishop of San Juan (2000 – December 2007)
6. Bishop Ruben González Medina, C.M.F., Bishop of Ponce (December 2007 – December 2012)
7. Archbishop Roberto Octavio González Nieves, Archbishop of San Juan (December 2012 – present)

== CEP's Proper Liturgical Calendar ==
The proper calendar of Puerto Rico, as requested by the Puerto Rican Episcopal Conference and approved by the Holy See:

- 3 January: Our Lady of Bethlehem – Optional Memorial (Memorial – San Juan)
- 10 January: Blessed María Dolores Rodríguez Sopeña, virgin – Optional Memorial
- 4 May: Blessed Carlos Manuel Cecilio Rodríguez Santiago – Optional Memorial (Memorial - Caguas)
- 24 June: Nativity of John the Baptist, Patron Saint of Archdiocese of San Juan – Solemnity (San Juan)
- 27 June: Our Lady of Perpetual Help, Patron Saint of Diocese of Arecibo – Feast (Arecibo)
- 16 July: Our Lady of Mount Carmel (also: Co-Patron Saint of Diocese of Fajardo-Humacao) – Feast
- 25 July: Saint James the Apostle, Co-Patron Saint of Diocese of Fajardo-Humacao – Feast (Fajardo-Humacao)
- First Thursday of July: Rogation at the Beginning of the Hurricane Season
- 26 August: Saint Teresa of Jesus Jornet e Ibars, virgin – Optional Memorial
- 30 August: Saint Rose of Lima, virgin – Feast
- 31 August: Beheading of John the Baptist – Memorial (Mayagüez)
- 8 September: Our Lady of Monserrate of Hormigueros, Patron Saint of Diocese of Mayagüez – Feast (Mayagüez)
- 10 September: Blesseds Carlos Spínola and Jerónimo de Angelis, priests and martyrs – Optional Memorial
- 11 October: Saint Soledad Torres y Acosta, virgin – Optional Memorial
- 20 October: Saint Junipero Serra, priest – Memorial
- 24 October: Saint Antonio Maria Claret, bishop – Memorial
- 3 November: Saint Martin de Porres, religious – Memorial
- 6 November: Blessed Fernando Llovera Puigsech, priest, and companions, martyrs – Optional Memorial (Arecibo)
- 19 November: Our Lady, Mother of Divine Providence, Patroness of Puerto Rico – Solemnity
- 27 November: Our Lady of the Miraculous Medal – Optional Memorial
- Fourth Thursday of November: Ember Day of Thanksgiving and Rogation for Human Activity
- 9 December: Saint Juan Diego, Guadalupe Seer – Optional Memorial
- 12 December: Our Lady of Guadalupe (also: Patron Saint of Diocese of Ponce) – Feast
- 16 December: Expectation of the Blessed Virgin Mary – Memorial
- II & III Feriae of the IV Week of Easter: Rogation for Vocations to Holy Orders and Consecrated Life
- Monday after Pentecost: Blessed Mary, Mother of the Church, Patron Saint of the Diocese of Caguas – Feast (Caguas)
- Thursday after Pentecost: Our Lord Jesus Christ, the Eternal High Priest – Feast

== See also ==
- Roman Catholicism in Puerto Rico
- Episcopal conference #North America
- List of the Catholic bishops of the United States #Province of San Juan de Puerto Rico
- United States Conference of Catholic Bishops (USCCB)
