= Felix O'Neill =

Felix O'Neill may refer to:

- Félix O'Neill (mayor) (1800–1870), mayor of Ponce, Puerto Rico
- Felix O'Neill (died 1709), Irish nobleman
- Felim O'Neill of Kinard, Irish nobleman
