= Hilarión Pérez Guerra =

Mayor of Ponce, Puerto Rico

62nd Mayor of Ponce, Puerto Rico
- In office January 1857 – 11 July 1863
- Preceded by: Pedro Juan Capó
- Succeeded by: Luis de Quixano y Font

Personal details
- Born: c. 1813
- Died: May 15, 1871 Ponce, Puerto Rico
- Spouse: Natividad Giocochea
- Parent(s): Tomás Pérez Guerra; María del Carmen Miura
- Profession: politician

Hilarión Pérez Guerra y Miura (c. 1813 – 1871) was Mayor of Ponce, Puerto Rico, from January 1857 to 11 July 1863. Prior to serving as mayor of Ponce, Pérez Guerra had served as mayor of Camuy for 1 year in 1850.

== Biography ==
Hilarión Pérez Guerra y Miura was the son of former Mayor of Ponce Tomás Pérez Guerra y Sánchez, a native of Santiago de los Caballeros, and María del Carmen Miura y Pepin, a native of Santo Domingo. Hilarión married Natividad Goicochea y Elfao (1826-1883). He died on May 15, 1871 in Ponce at the age of 58.

== Mayoral term ==
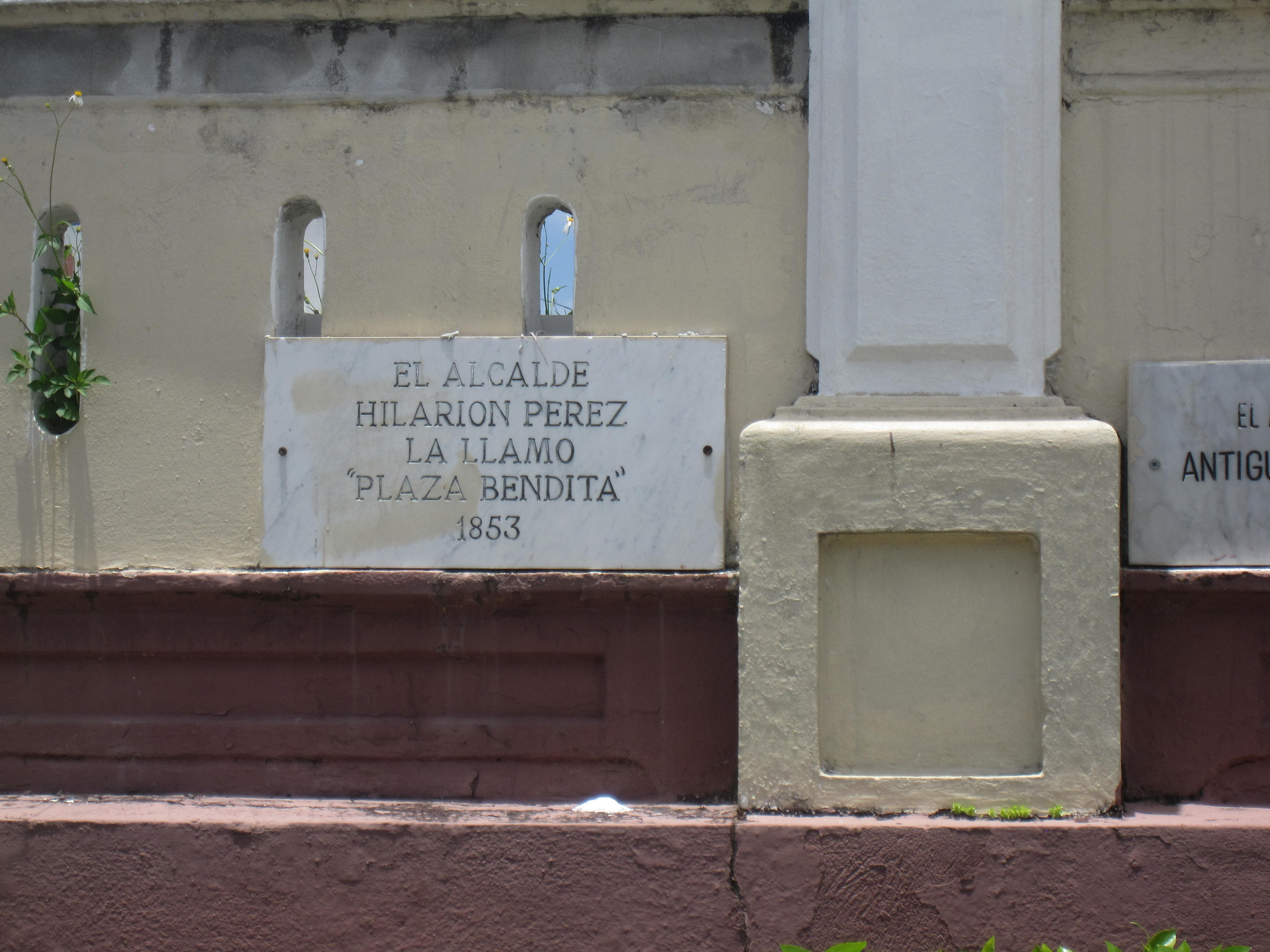
Plaque on outside wall of Nuestra Señora de la Candelaria church in Manatí, Puerto Rico, where it says mayor Hilarión Pérez Guerra called the plaza where this church is located "blessed."

A festivity, later known as Carnaval de Ponce, takes place in 1858. This is the earliest known recorded date of the event taking place in Ponce.

== See also ==
- List of Puerto Ricans
- List of mayors of Ponce, Puerto Rico

Political offices
Preceded by Pedro Juan Capó	Mayor of Ponce, Puerto Rico; January 1857 – 11 July 1863	Succeeded by Luis de Quixano y Font
