= Iñaki Mallona Txertudi =

Roman Catholic bishop (1932–2021)

His Excellency, The Most Reverend Iñaki Mallona Txertudi
- Bishop Emeritus of Arecibo
- Archdiocese: San Juan
- Diocese: Arecibo
- Appointed: December 14, 1991
- Installed: January 25, 1992
- Term ended: September 24, 2010
- Predecessor: Miguel Rodriguez Rodriguez
- Successor: Daniel Fernández Torres

Orders
- Ordination: Mar 27, 1956
- Consecration: January 6, 1992 by John Paul II, Giovanni Battista Re, and Josip Uhač

Personal details
- Born: July 1, 1932 Fruiz, Spain
- Died: May 3, 2021 (aged 88) Lares, Puerto Rico
- Buried: Catedral de San Felipe Apostol in Arecibo, Puerto Rico

Styles of Iñaki Mallona Txertudi
- Reference style: His Excellency; The Most Reverend
- Spoken style: Your Excellency
- Religious style: Bishop

Iñaki Mallona Txertudi, C.P. (July 1, 1932 – May 3, 2021) was a Spanish-born prelate of the Roman Catholic Church who served as Bishop of the Diocese of Arecibo in Puerto Rico from 1992 to 2010.

== Biography ==
=== Early life and ordination ===
Txertudi was born in Fruiz, Spain. He was ordained a priest for the Congregation of the Passion (Passionists) on March 27, 1956.

=== Bishop of Arecibo ===
On December 14, 1991, Txertudi was appointed Bishop of the Diocese of Arecibo. He was consecrated by Pope John Paul II in Rome on January 6, 1992, with Archbishops Giovanni Re and Josip Uhac serving as co-consecrators. He was installed on January 25, 1992.

=== Retirement ===
On September 24, 2010, Pope Benedict XVI accepted Txertudi's resignation as bishop of Arecibo.

Txertudi died at age 88 of Alzheimer's disease on May 3, 2021, at the Hogar Irma Fe Pol nursing home in Lares, Puerto Rico.

Catholic Church titles
| Preceded by Miguel Rodriguez Rodriguez, C.SS.R. | Bishop of Arecibo; 1992—2010 | Succeeded by Daniel Fernández Torres |
