= Pedro Juan Capó =

Mayor of Ponce, Puerto Rico

61st Mayor of Ponce, Puerto Rico
- In office September 1856 – December 1856
- Preceded by: Félix O'Neill
- Succeeded by: Hilarión Pérez Guerra

Personal details
- Born: c. 1800
- Died: c. 1890
- Occupation: Farmer Hacendado

Pedro Juan Capó was Mayor of Ponce, Puerto Rico, from September 1856 to December 1856.

== Biography ==
Capó was one of the major landlords in the municipality of Santa Isabel. In Santa Isabel, Capó owned both lands and the slaves to work them. He owned hacienda El Destino (The Destiny), one of the few haciendas which, as of 2008, still existed in good condition. The hacienda is located in Santa Isabel's barrio Jauca.

== See also ==
- List of Puerto Ricans
- List of mayors of Ponce, Puerto Rico

Political offices
| Preceded by Félix O'Neill | Mayor of Ponce, Puerto Rico; September 1856 - December 1856 | Succeeded by Hilarión Pérez Guerra |
