= Alberto Arturo Figueroa Morales =

Puerto Rican Roman Catholic bishop

His Excellency, The Most Reverend Alberto Arturo Figueroa Morales
- Bishop of Arecibo
- Diocese: Arecibo
- Appointed: September 14, 2022
- Installed: October 17, 2022
- Predecessor: Daniel Fernández Torres
- Previous posts: Auxiliary Bishop of San Juan (2019–2022); Titular Bishop of Phelbes (2019-2022)

Orders
- Ordination: June 2, 1990 by Ulises Aurelio Casiano Vargas
- Consecration: December 27, 2019 by Roberto González Nieves, Rubén González Medina, and Ghaleb Moussa Abdalla Bader

Personal details
- Born: August 9, 1961 (age 65) Guaynabo, Puerto Rico, US
- Education: Pontifical Catholic University of Puerto Rico; Center for Caribbean Dominican Studies; University of Navarra; Pontifical University of Saint Anthony; Pontifical University of Salamanca
- Motto: Adonde no hay amor, pon amor y sacarás amor (Where there is no love, put in love and you will bring out love)

Styles of Alberto Arturo Figueroa Morales
- Reference style: His Excellency; The Most Reverend
- Spoken style: Your Excellency
- Religious style: Bishop

Alberto Arturo Figueroa Morales (born August 9, 1961) is a Puerto Rican prelate of the Catholic Church. He has been bishop of the Diocese of Arecibo in Puerto Rico since 2022. He served as an auxiliary bishop of the Archdiocese of San Juan in Puerto Rico from 2019 to 2022.

He was a member of the Capuchin Friars for several years while preparing for the priesthood and again from 1991 to 2010 while a priest. He became a secular priest of the Archdiocese of San Juan in 2010.

== Biography ==
=== Early life ===
Alberto Figueroa Morales was born on August 9, 1961, in Guaynabo, Puerto Rico. He attended elementary and secondary school at several Catholic and public schools in Guaynabo and graduated in 1979. In 1981, he entered the Capuchin Friars as a postulant and studied at the Pontifical Catholic University of Puerto Rico (PUCPR) in Ponce, Puerto Rico, obtaining a Bachelor of Philosophy degree in 1984. After completing the novitiate, Figueroa Morales made his temporary profession in 1985. He began theology studies at the Center for Dominican Studies in the Caribbean (Note: Centro de Estudios de los Dominicos del Caribe (CEDOC)) in Bayamón, Puerto Rico.

In 1986, Figueroa Morales received a dispensation from his temporary vows and entered the diocesan seminary Jesús Maestro of the Diocese of Arecibo. After completing his studies in theology at the University of Navarra in Pamplona, Spain, he was ordained a deacon in 1989.

=== Priest ===
On June 2, 1990, Figueroa Morales was ordained a priest by Bishop Ulises Aurelio Casiano Vargas of Mayagüez (Note: Casiano Vargas was apostolic administrator of Arecibo at the time; the see of Arecibo was vacant.) for the Diocese of Arecibo.

In 1991 he rejoined the Capuchins and in 1995 took his solemn vows. He worked in the archdiocese as a parish priest and pastor while holding positions of increasing responsibility within his order and for the archdiocese until he left the Capuchins and was incardinated in the Archdiocese of San Juan in 2010. He was parish priest of Santa Teresita (Note: Santa Teresita is home to a community of Third Order Carmelites, one of 16 in Puerto Rico as of 2023.) in Ponce from 1991 to 1993. In 1995, Figueroa Morales completed a licentiate in sacred theology at the Pontifical University of Saint Anthony (Antonianum) in Rome. He returned to San Juan and was parish priest of Santa Teresita and Master of Franciscan Novices from 1995 to 2000; vice provincial of the San Juan Capuchins from 2000 to 2008; episcopal vicar of Río Piedras from 2009 to 2016; parish priest of Luisa de Marillac in San Juan from 2009 to 2019; vicar general and moderator of the archdiocesan curia, a member of the Presbyteral and Pastoral Council, and member of the College of Consultors and the Economic Committee from 2016 to 2019.

He made his perpetual profession as a Carmelite tertiary in the Community of Santa Teresita of the Third Order of Carmelites on July 20, 2017. (Note: His name as a Carmelite is Alberto María de San José. "The Third Order is the branch of the Carmelite Order for lay people and diocesan clergy who ... make a formal and public commitment to living the Carmelite way of life ... live the Carmelite charism and practice the Evangelical Counsels of poverty, chastity and obedience according to their personal state in life.") In 2018 he received a master of canon law degree from the Pontifical University of Salamanca in Spain.

=== Auxiliary Bishop of San Juan ===
Pope Francis appointed Figueroa Morales auxiliary bishop for the Archdiocese of San Juan on November 19, 2019. Figueroa Morales received his episcopal consecration on December 27, 2019, from Archbishop Roberto González Nieves of San Juan, assisted by Archbishop Ghaleb Moussa Abdalla Bader, apostolic delegate to Puerto Rico, and Bishop Ruben González Medina of Ponce. (Note: González Medina was president of the Puerto Rican Episcopal Conference.) He was the youngest bishop in Puerto Rico. He chose as his episcopal motto the words of Saint John of the Cross: "Adonde no hay amor, por amor y sacarás amor" ("Where there is no love, put love, and you will bring love forth").

=== Bishop of Arecibo ===
On September 14, 2022, Pope Francis appointed Figueroa Morales bishop of Arecibo. He was installed there on October 17, 2022. His appointment followed Pope Francis' removal of his predecessor in Arecibo, Bishop Daniel Fernández Torres, the previous March.

== See also ==
- Catholic Church hierarchy
- Catholic Church in the United States
- Historical list of the Catholic bishops of Puerto Rico
- List of Catholic bishops of the United States
- Lists of patriarchs, archbishops, and bishops

Catholic Church titles
Preceded by	Auxiliary Bishop of San Juan; 2019–2022	Succeeded by
Preceded by Daniel Fernández Torres	Bishop of Arecibo; 2022–present	Incumbent
