= Catedral de San Felipe Apóstol (Arecibo, Puerto Rico) =

Church in Puerto Rico, US

Arecibo Cathedral
- Cathedral of Saint Philip the Apostle
- Catedral de San Felipe Apóstol
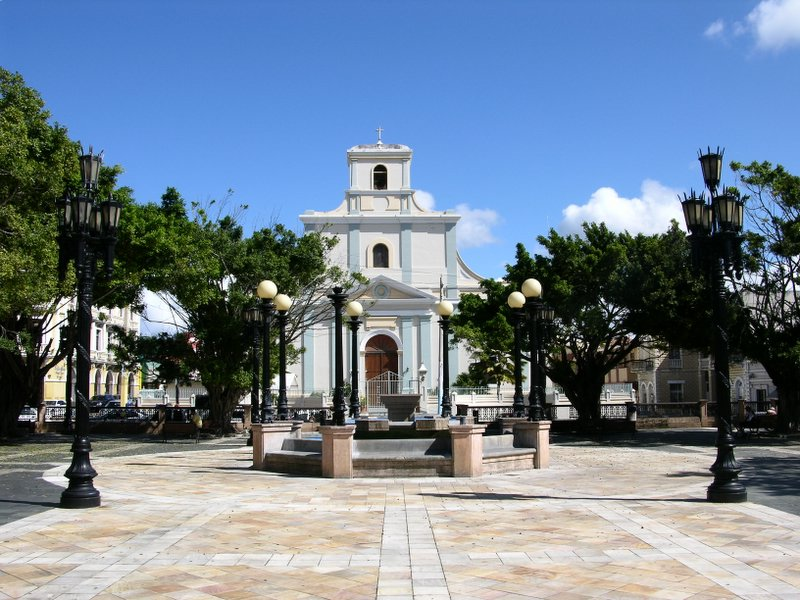
- Cathedral façade from the main plaza

- Location of Arecibo and the cathedral in Puerto Rico
- 18.4722°N 66.7151°W
- Location: Arecibo Pueblo, Arecibo, Puerto Rico
- Denomination: Catholic Church
- Sui iuris church: Latin Church
- Website: diocesisdearecibo.org

History
- Status: Cathedral

Architecture
- Heritage designation: Puerto Rico Register of Historic Sites and Zones
- Designated: December 21, 2000
- Style: Spanish Colonial
- Completed: 1846

Administration
- Diocese: Arecibo

Clergy
- Bishop: Most Rev. Alberto Arturo Figueroa Morales

The Cathedral of St. Philip the Apostle (Spanish: Catedral de San Felipe Apóstol) is the Catholic cathedral of Arecibo, Puerto Rico, and the seat of the Diocese of Arecibo since its establishment in 1960.

== Description ==
The cathedral of Arecibo is Puerto Rico's second-largest church after the Metropolitan Cathedral Basilica of San Juan. The plan is rectangular with three naves; the side naves are cut short to allow large flanking chapels, which occupy almost half the length of the church. The apse is semicircular, and has an unusual half-dome covering it. The facade is a triangular composition of three stages. The top stage, a short central tower, is a later addition, according to local architects and historians. Neoclassic ornamentation is used in an academic fashion on the lowest stage, but the other two show a less traditional use of bands and pilasters. The Renaissance-style windows are uncommon in Puerto Rican churches, but the central tower over the entrance is a common motif used throughout the island.

== History ==
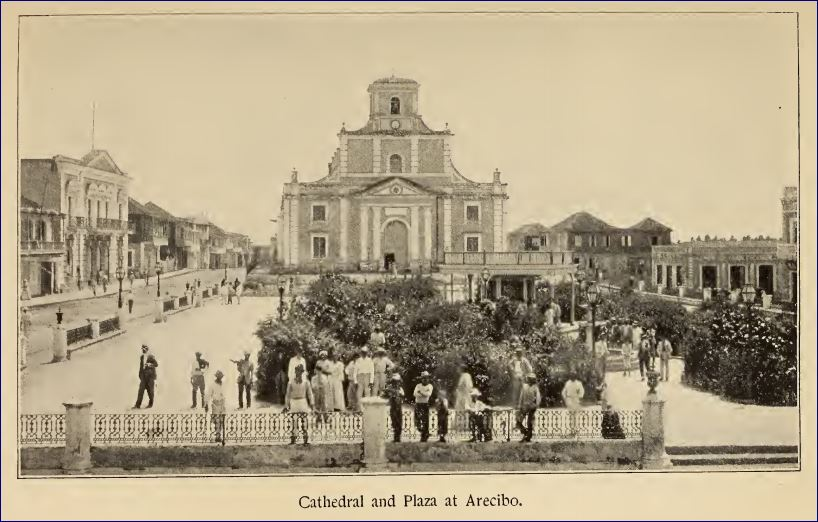
View of the cathedral in 1899

The first iteration of the church was established sometime between the Spanish settlement of Arecibo in 1556 and the official founding of the town of Arecibo in 1616. The first parish church, built in the middle of the 17th century, was destroyed by an earthquake in 1787.

The current cathedral building, dedicated to Saint Philip the Apostle, was built during different stages between the late 18th century and 1846 due to the impact of hurricanes and earthquakes throughout its edification process. Four days after its official dedication in 1846, it was seriously damaged by another earthquake. Repairs were not completed until 1882, seven years after yet another earthquake that impacted Puerto Rico in 1875. The 1918 earthquake further damaged the vault so badly that it had to be replaced by a flat concrete roof; a vaulted ceiling of composition board was placed inside.

The parish church became a cathedral when the Diocese of Arecibo was established on April 30, 1960. Although not ultimately listed in the federal historic register itself, it was added to the Puerto Rico Register of Historic Sites and Zones and it was one of 31 Puerto Rican churches listed as part of the Historic Churches of Puerto Rico multiple property submission (MPS).

== Gallery ==
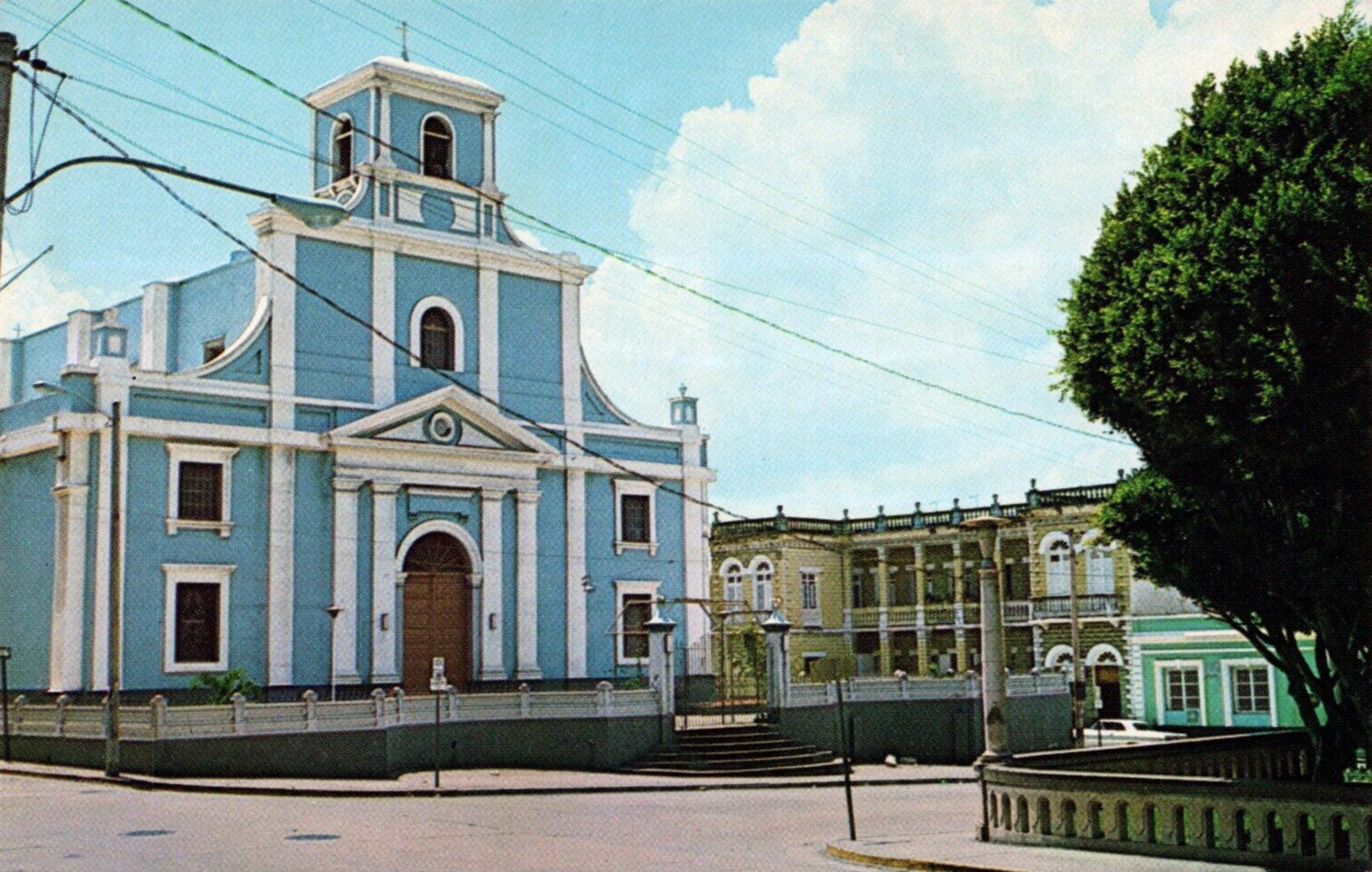
Cathedral façade in 1965

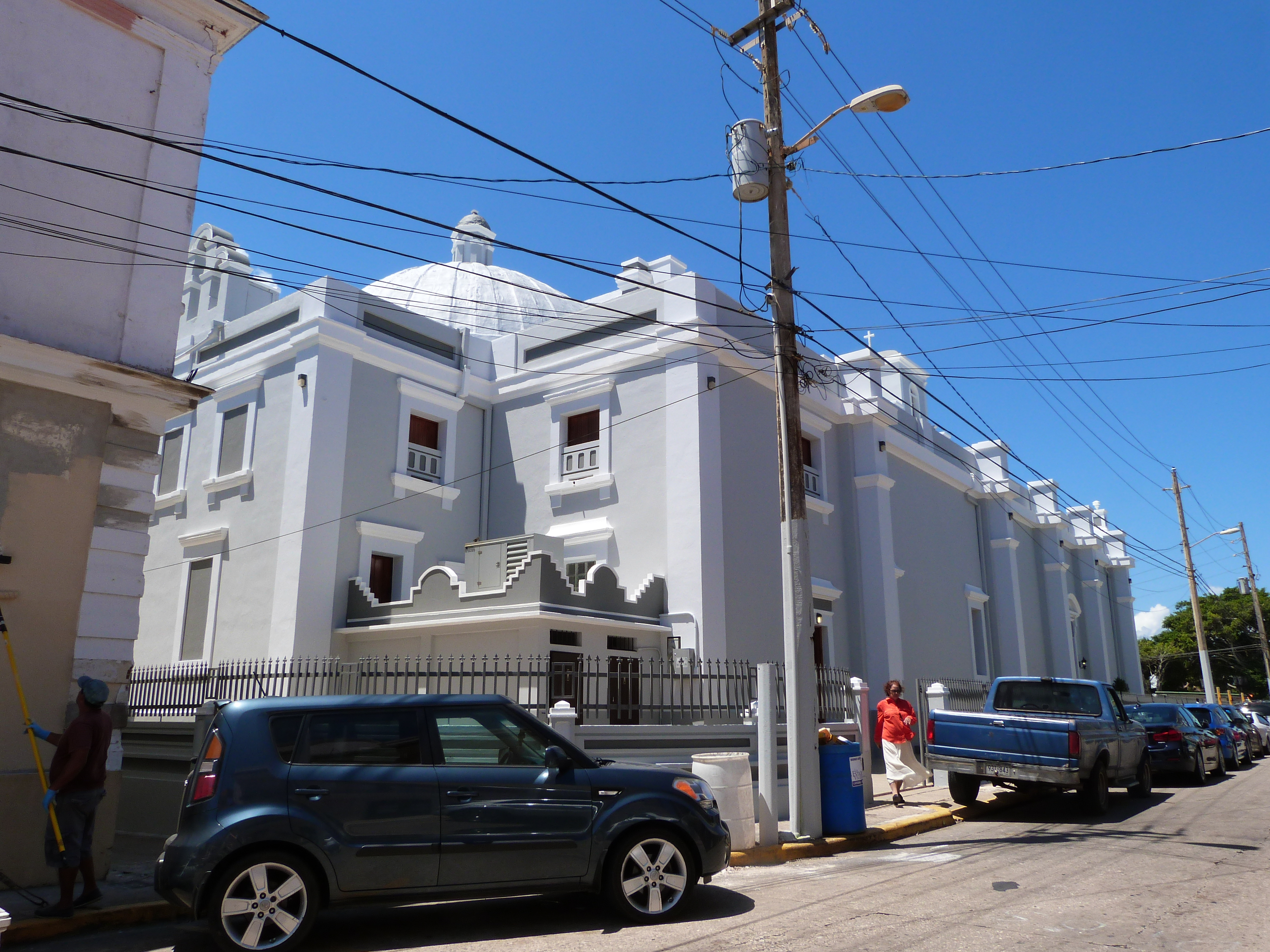
Cathedral rear in 2017

== See also ==
- List of Catholic cathedrals in the United States
- List of cathedrals in the United States
- Catholic Church in the United States
