= Church San Miguel Arcángel of Utuado =

Historic church in Utuado Pueblo, Puerto Rico

- Church San Miguel Arcangel of Utuado
- U.S. National Register of Historic Places
- Puerto Rico Historic Sites and Zones
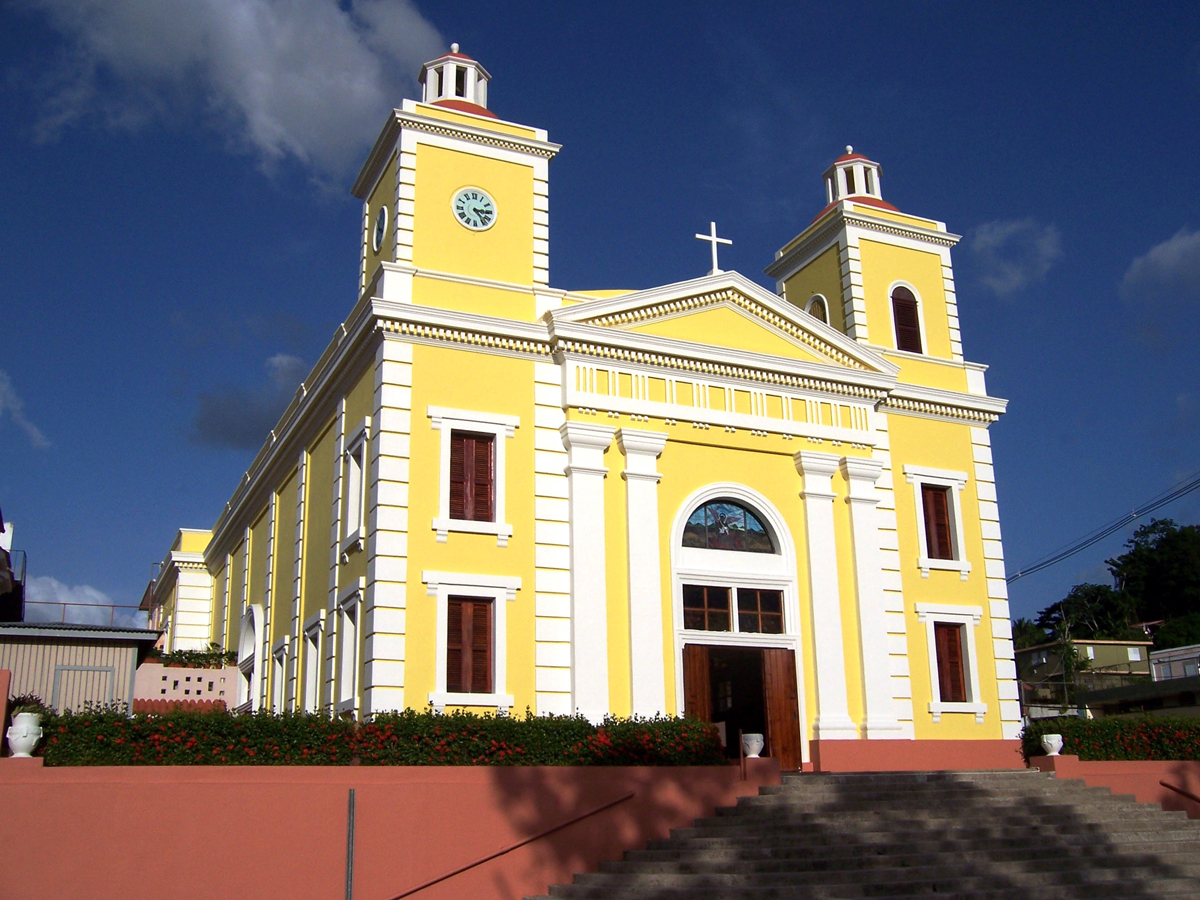
- The church in 2007.

- Location within Puerto Rico
- Location: Dr. Barbosa Street in the town square (plaza) of Utuado, Puerto Rico
- Coordinates: 18°15′55″N 66°41′57″W
- Built: 1872
- Architectural style: Spanish Colonial
- NRHP reference No.: 84000447
- RNSZH No.: 2000-(RC)-22-JP-SH

Significant dates
- Added to NRHP: December 10, 1984
- Designated RNSZH: March 15, 2001

The Church of Saint Michael the Archangel of Utuado (Spanish: Iglesia San Miguel Arcángel de Utuado) is a historic Roman Catholic parish church located in Utuado Pueblo, the administrative and historic center of the municipality of Utuado, Puerto Rico. The church is listed in the Inventory of the Historic Churches of Puerto Rico, the Puerto Rico Register of Historic Sites and Zones and the United States National Register of Historic Places due to its architectural and historical significance.

The church was designed in 1866 by Onofre Llorapart and built in stages between 1872 and 1878 in the main town square (plaza pública) of Utuado, on its east-facing block that it currently shares with the parish house (casa parroquial) and its adjacent Catholic school. This urban setting is highly traditional of the historic downtowns (pueblos) of Puerto Rico. The exterior and façade of the building showcase the traditional Spanish Colonial architecture of the 19th-century contemporary churches of Puerto Rico with elements inspired in Renaissance and Neoclassical architecture. With the exception of routine renovations and the removal of the Renaissance-style side pillars and arcades of the church in 1965, the building is well preserved and has never suffered from integrity-endangering modifications.

== Gallery ==
Exterior

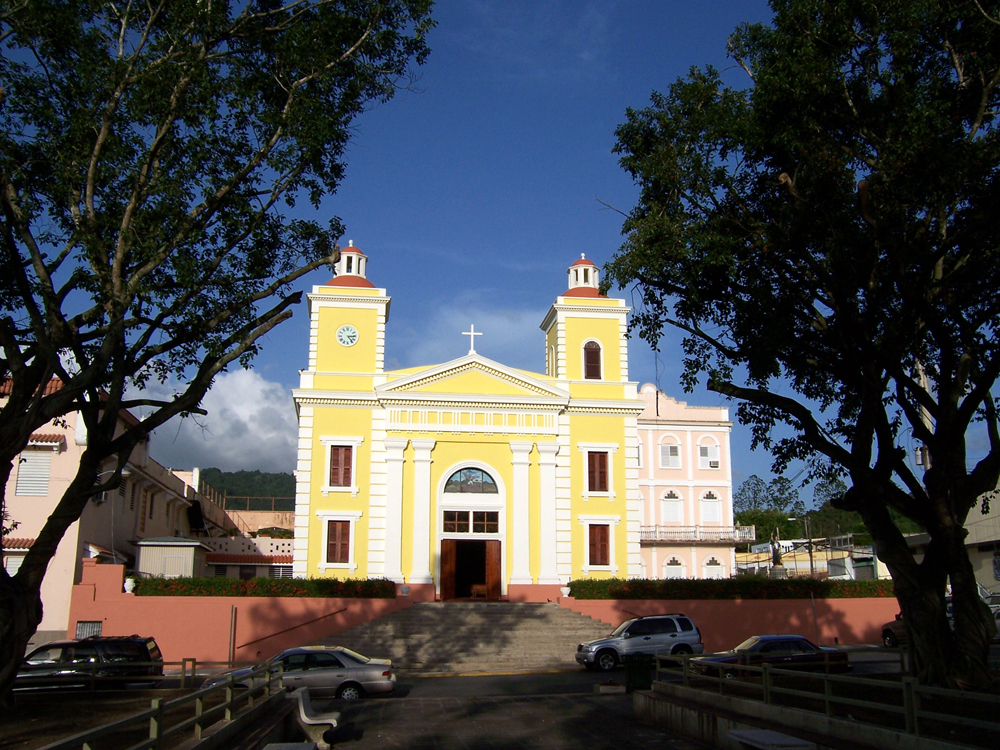
2007

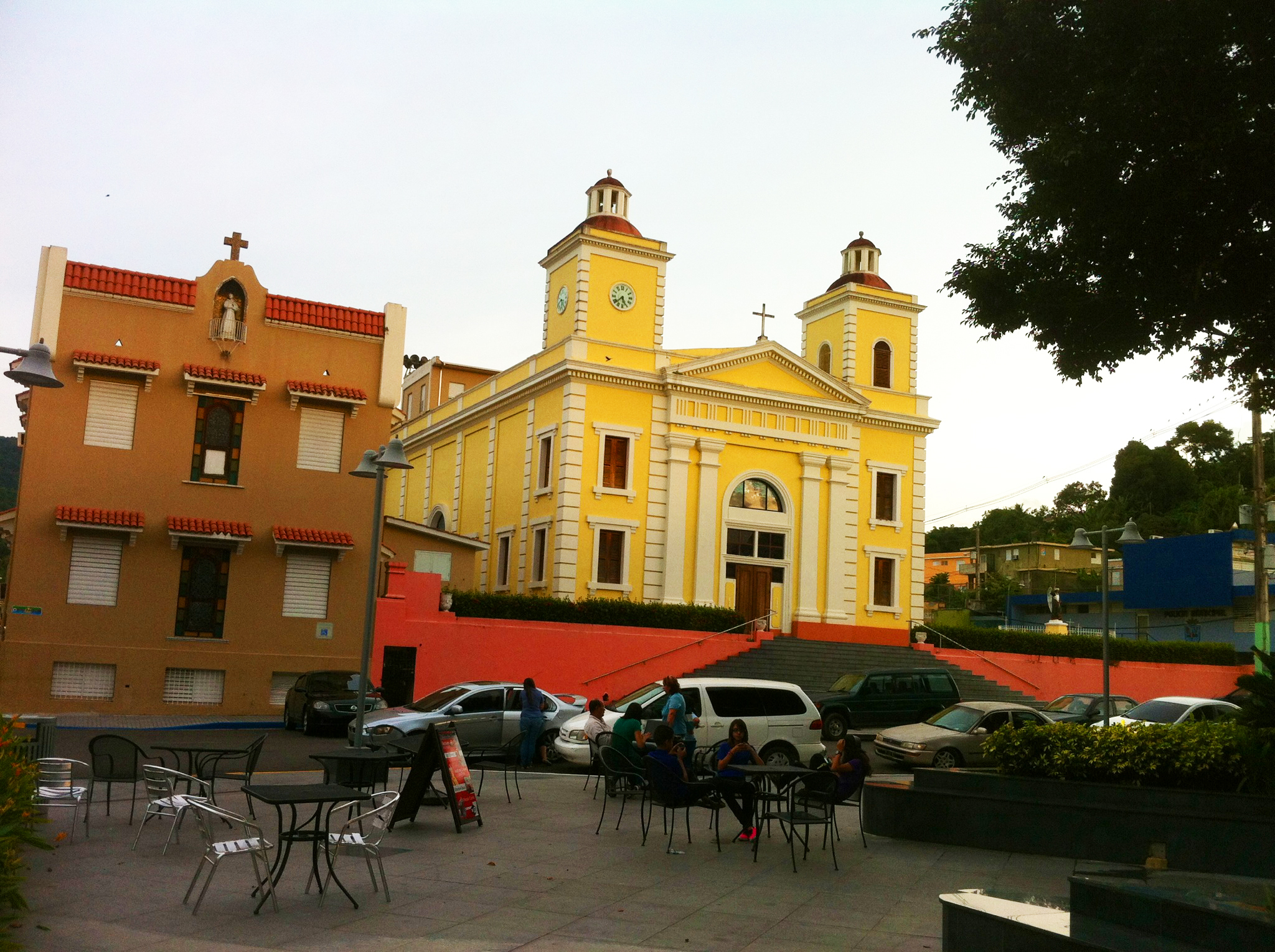

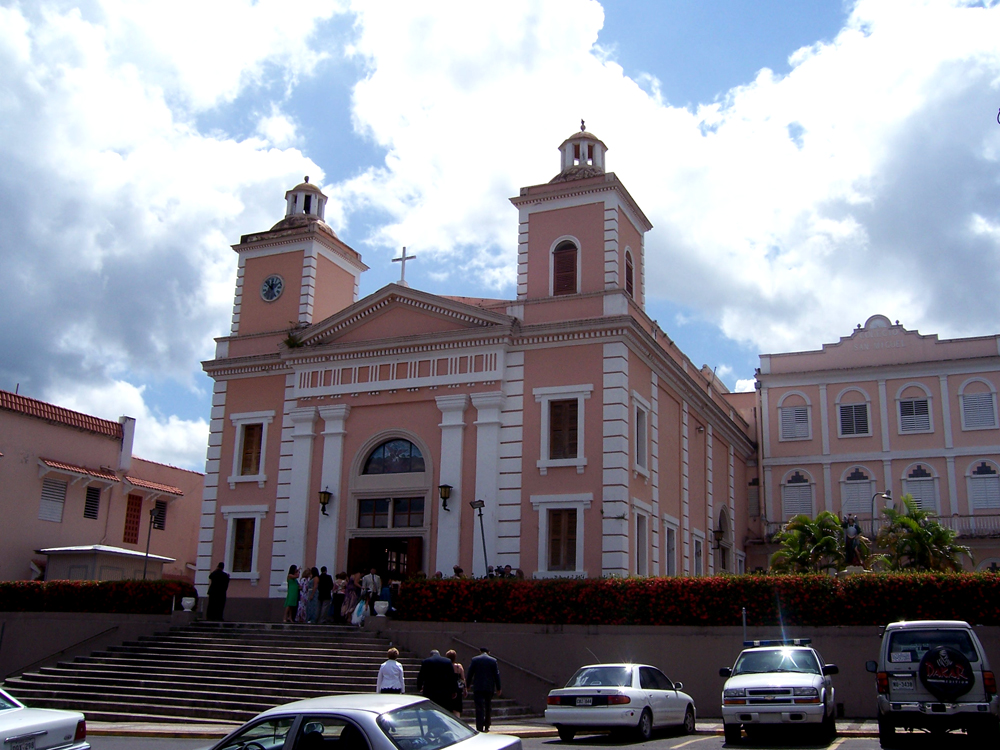
2016
Interior

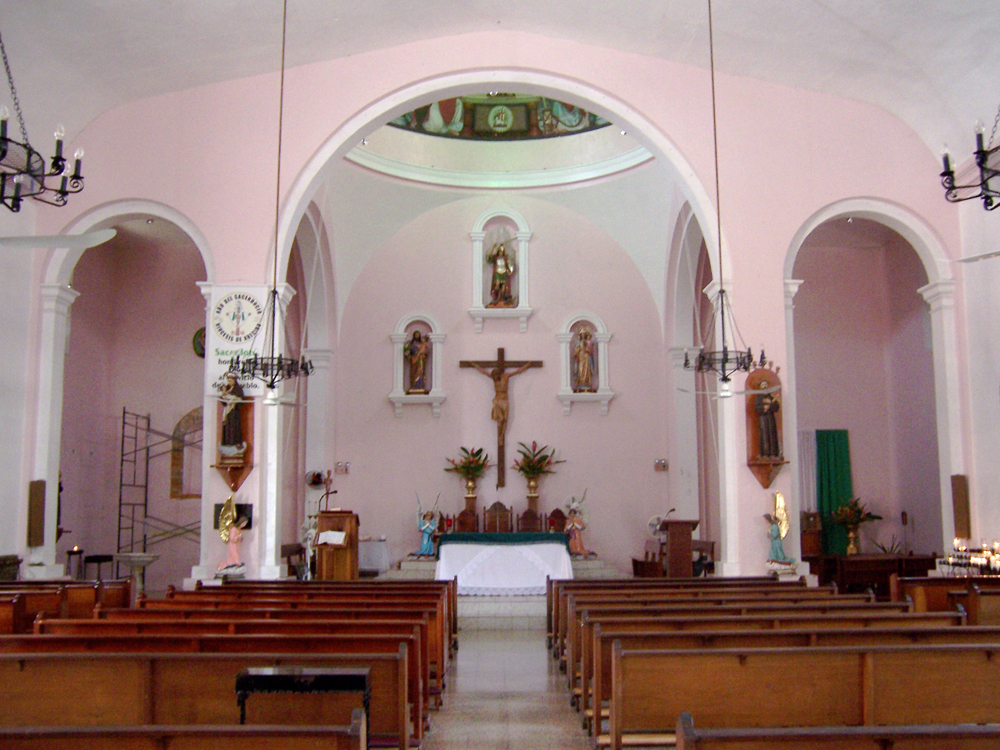

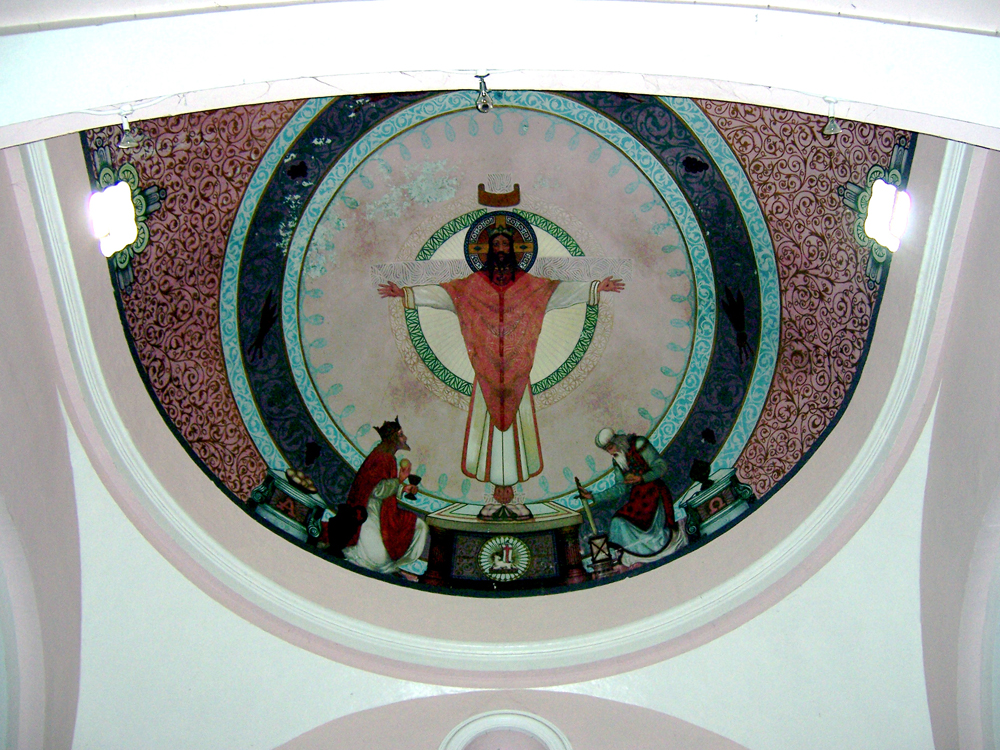

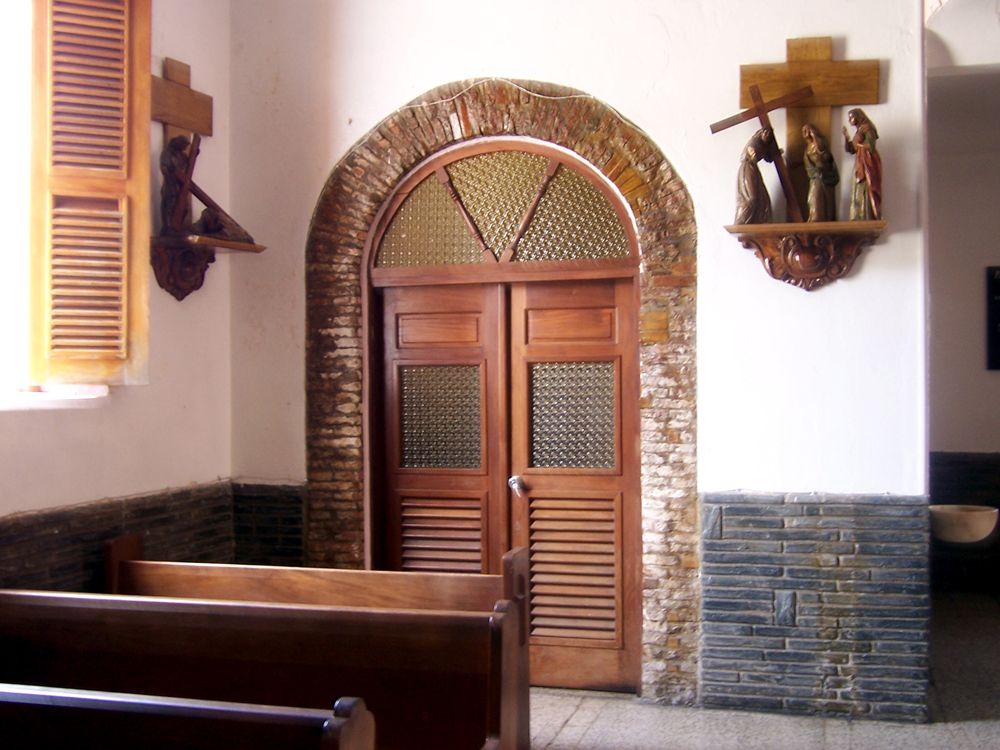

== See also ==
- National Register of Historic Places listings in central Puerto Rico
