= Félix O'Neill (mayor) =

Mayor of Ponce, Puerto Rico

Coronel Félix O'Neill

60th Mayor of Ponce, Puerto Rico
- In office 24 July 1854 – August 1856
- Preceded by: Antonio E. Molina
- Succeeded by: Pedro Juan Capó

Personal details
- Born: c. 1800
- Died: c. 1870
- Profession: Military

Félix O'Neill (c. 1800 – c. 1870) was Mayor of Ponce, Puerto Rico, from 24 July 1854 to August 1856. He was a Spanish military officer with the rank of Coronel.

== Mayoral term ==
He is well remembered for producing, on 20 August 1856, his 20-point edict titled "Disposiciones Acordadas Por la Municipalidad de Esta Villa, que deben observarse en caso de ser invadida esta Poblacion por la epidemia del Colera-morbo" (Dispositions Agreed Upon by the Municipal Government of this Village, to be observed in the event our People are invaded by the Cholera Morbus epidemic). The gastroenteritis cholera had just invaded the town earlier that month.

== See also ==
- List of Puerto Ricans
- List of mayors of Ponce, Puerto Rico

Political offices
| Preceded by Antonio E. Molina | Mayor of Ponce, Puerto Rico; 24 July 1854 - August 1856 | Succeeded by Pedro Juan Capó |
