= Daniel Fernández Torres =

Puerto Rican Catholic prelate

His Excellency, The Most Reverend Daniel Fernández Torres
- Bishop Emeritus of Arecibo
- Church: Roman Catholicism
- Diocese: Diocese of Arecibo
- Appointed: September 24, 2010
- Installed: October 3, 2010
- Retired: March 9, 2022
- Predecessor: Iñaki Mallona Txertudi
- Successor: Alberto Arturo Figueroa Morales
- Previous post: Auxiliary Bishop of San Juan and Titular Bishop of Sufes (2007-2010)

Orders
- Ordination: January 7, 1995
- Consecration: April 21, 2007 by Roberto González Nieves, Iñaki Mallona Txertudi, and Ulises Aurelio Casiano Vargas

Personal details
- Born: April 27, 1964 (age 62) Chicago, Illinois, US
- Motto: No hay temor en el amor (There is no fear in love)

Styles of Daniel Fernández Torres
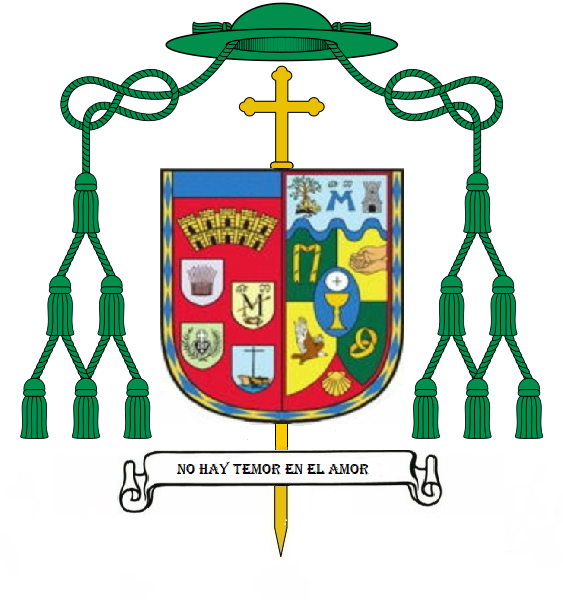
- Reference style: His Excellency; The Most Reverend
- Spoken style: Your Excellency
- Religious style: Bishop

Daniel Fernández Torres (born April 27, 1964) is a Puerto Rican Catholic prelate who served as bishop of the Diocese of Arecibo in Puerto Rico from 2010 to 2022. He spent the years 2007 to 2010 as an auxiliary bishop of the Archdiocese of San Juan in Puerto Rico.

Fernández was removed as bishop of Arecibo by Pope Francis on March 9, 2022, after refusing a papal request to resign.

== Biography ==
=== Early life ===
Daniel Fernández was born into a Puerto Rican family in Chicago, Illinois. He earned a bachelor's degree in industrial engineering at the University of Puerto Rico. He then studied at the international seminary (Colegio Eclesiástico Internacional Bidasoa) in Pamplona, Spain. From 1996 to 1998, Fernández studied at the Pontifical Gregorian University in Rome, obtaining his Licentiate in Dogmatic Theology.

=== Priesthood ===
Fernández was ordained a priest by Bishop Iñaki Mallona Txertudi for the Diocese of Arecibo on January 7, 1995. He then fulfilled assignments as parish vicar, bishop's representative to the council of seminaries, rector of the Seminary "Jesus Maestro", director of pastoral services for youth, dean of the Major Seminary of San Juan, and parish priest at Our Lady of Carmen Parish in Arecibo, Puerto Rico.

=== Auxiliary Bishop of San Juan ===
Fernández was appointed as an auxiliary bishop for the Archdiocese of San Juan by Pope Benedict XVI on February 14, 2007. On April 27, 2007, Fernández was consecrated a bishop at Santa Teresita Church in Santurce, PR by Archbishop Roberto González Nieves. Bishops Txertudi and Ulises Aurelio Casiano Vargas served as his co-consecrators.

In a 2009 letter to Puerto Rico's apostolic delegate, González Nieves recommended that the Vatican transfer Fernández to a U.S. diocese rather than appoint him bishop of Arecibo. Nieves said that Fernández caused “friction” within Puerto Rico's episcopal conference, displayed "rigidity," and rarely socialized with priests of the archdiocese.

=== Bishop of Arecibo ===
Pope Benedict XVI named Fernández as bishop of Arecibo on September 24, 2010; he was installed there on October 3, 2010.

In 2014, the Congregation for the Doctrine of the Faith announced that it had conducted an investigation into complaints of sexual misconduct against Fernández and dismissed the allegations. Fernández had said the complaints were motivated by opposition to his pursuit of priests accused on sexual abuse. By then, he had removed six of his priests from active ministry. In 2014, Fernández sued unsuccessfully to deny government investigators access to additional information about cases of sexual abuse, claiming that the diocese had provided sufficient detail and feared that investigators would reveal the identities of those filing complaints. (Note: In reporting this lawsuit, La Stampa added an editorial comment that the delay caused by the lawsuit and additional time given the diocese to provide documentation "threatens to prolong an endless crisis for the Puerto Rican Church".)

In July 2018, Cardinal Fernando Filoni, prefect of the Congregation for the Evangelization of Peoples, appointed Fernández to a five-year term as director of the Pontifical Mission Societies in Puerto Rico. Fernández refused to send seminarians from his diocese to the Interdiocesan Seminary of Puerto Rico when it was approved by the Vatican in March 2020, sending them instead to Spain.

In December 2020, Fernández wrote to Pedro Pierluisi, the incoming governor of Puerto Rico, about the problem of violence against women. Fernández said that

...gender ideology...extrapolates the class struggle from Marxism to the context family life...to convert relations between the sexes...into a struggle of sexual classes where the woman is always the oppressed, just for being a woman, and the man the oppressor, just for being a man.

Fernández said the outgoing administration of Puerto Rico had waged war on religion in the name of women's liberation. He called for a rejection of the view that counts religion and the family among the social institutions to blame for the victimization of women in society.

Fernández published a statement on August 17, 2021, stating that a Catholic could have a conscientious objection to vaccination against COVID-19. He permitted priests and deacons of his diocese to sign letters of conscientious objection if requested to do so by parishioners. Fernández refused to sign an August 24, 2021, joint statement by the other bishops of Puerto Rico (Note: At the time, Puerto Rico's bishops numbered seven: the archbishop of San Juan, one auxiliary there, and the ordinaries of five suffragan dioceses.) that affirmed an "ethical duty to be vaccinated" against COVID-19. The statement announced the separation of the vaccinated and unvaccinated during the distribution of Communion, and advised the unvaccinated to not participate in person in other Church activities. The bishops' statement said they did "not see how a conscientious objection can be invoked from Catholic morality" against the vaccination program.

Fernández also refused to sign a joint bishops statement on restricting the celebration of traditional forms of the Mass. At some point during the COVID-19 pandemic, Fernández was summoned to appear at the Vatican in Rome, but he refused to go.

=== Removal ===
On October 1, 2021, Fernández received a request from Pope Francis to resign as bishop of Arecibo. On December 7, 2021, Fernández wrote to Cardinal Marc Ouellet, the prefect of the Congregation for Bishops. Fernández wrote that

...offering my resignation would be the same as declaring myself guilty of something of which I am consciously innocent, and would imply becoming an accomplice in a way of proceeding that is foreign to the Church.

In the December letter to Ouellet, Fernández requested written confirmation of the resignation request. He also requested a listing of the allegations against him, including breaking communion with his fellow bishops and disobedience to the pope. Fernández declared himself innocent of all charges. He defended his statements and conduct on the COVID-19 vaccine and stated his belief that disagreement on the subject was "the touchstone that sets off all this controversy." He also stated his willingness to send his seminarians to Puerto Rico's interdiocesan seminary if the Vatican wanted it.

On January 18, 2022, Fernández wrote to Pope Francis, offering to "clear up any doubts or distorted information that may have reached you" and stated that "since the first request for resignation, I have requested that the reasons for such a decision be presented to me in writing, but I have never received them." Fernández stated in his letter to Francis that he had started transferring his seminarians from Spain to the interdiocesan seminary in Puerto Rico. He expressed appreciation for the pope's willingness to receive him personally, but explained that he had not yet scheduled such a meeting because of his responsibility to care for his elderly parents.

In February 2022, Fernández wrote to Bishop Ghaleb Bader, the apostolic delegate to Puerto Rico, stating that because he had not received sufficient justification for his removal as bishop, he would not resign his see. On March 7, 2022, Fernández learned that his removal would be announced on March 9.

On March 9, 2022, Pope Francis removed Fernández as bishop of Arecibo. The announcement by the Holy See Press Office, as is customary in such cases, provided no explanation for this action. In response, Fernández called his removal "totally unjust". He said he was told he "had not been obedient to the pope nor ... in sufficient communion with my brother bishops of Puerto Rico". He wrote: "I feel blessed for suffering persecution and slander." Fernández subsequently made several requests for a meeting with Francis, which went unanswered.

In an interview conducted on May 19, 2022, Francis stated that the Diocese of Arecibo "[had] been in conflict for years."

== See also ==
- COVID-19 pandemic in Puerto Rico
- Rogelio Ricardo Livieres Plano

== Notes ==
Catholic Church titles
Preceded by -	Auxiliary Bishop of San Juan; 2007-2010	Succeeded by -
Preceded by Iñaki Mallona Txertudi	Bishop of Arecibo; 2010–2022	Succeeded by Alberto Arturo Figueroa Morales
