= Coto, Isabela, Puerto Rico =

Barrio of Puerto Rico

Coto
- Barrio
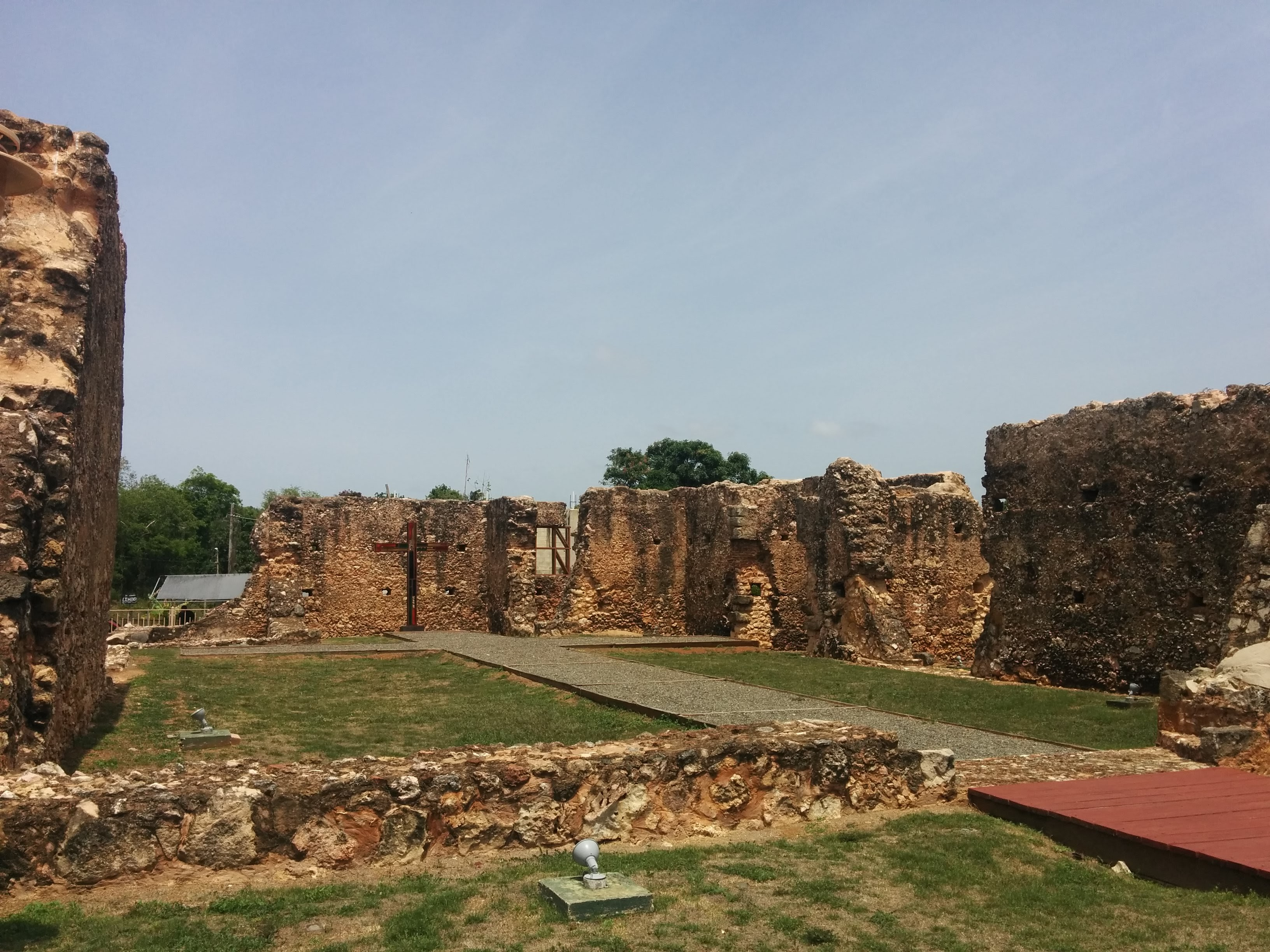
- Ruins of Ermita San Antonio de Padua

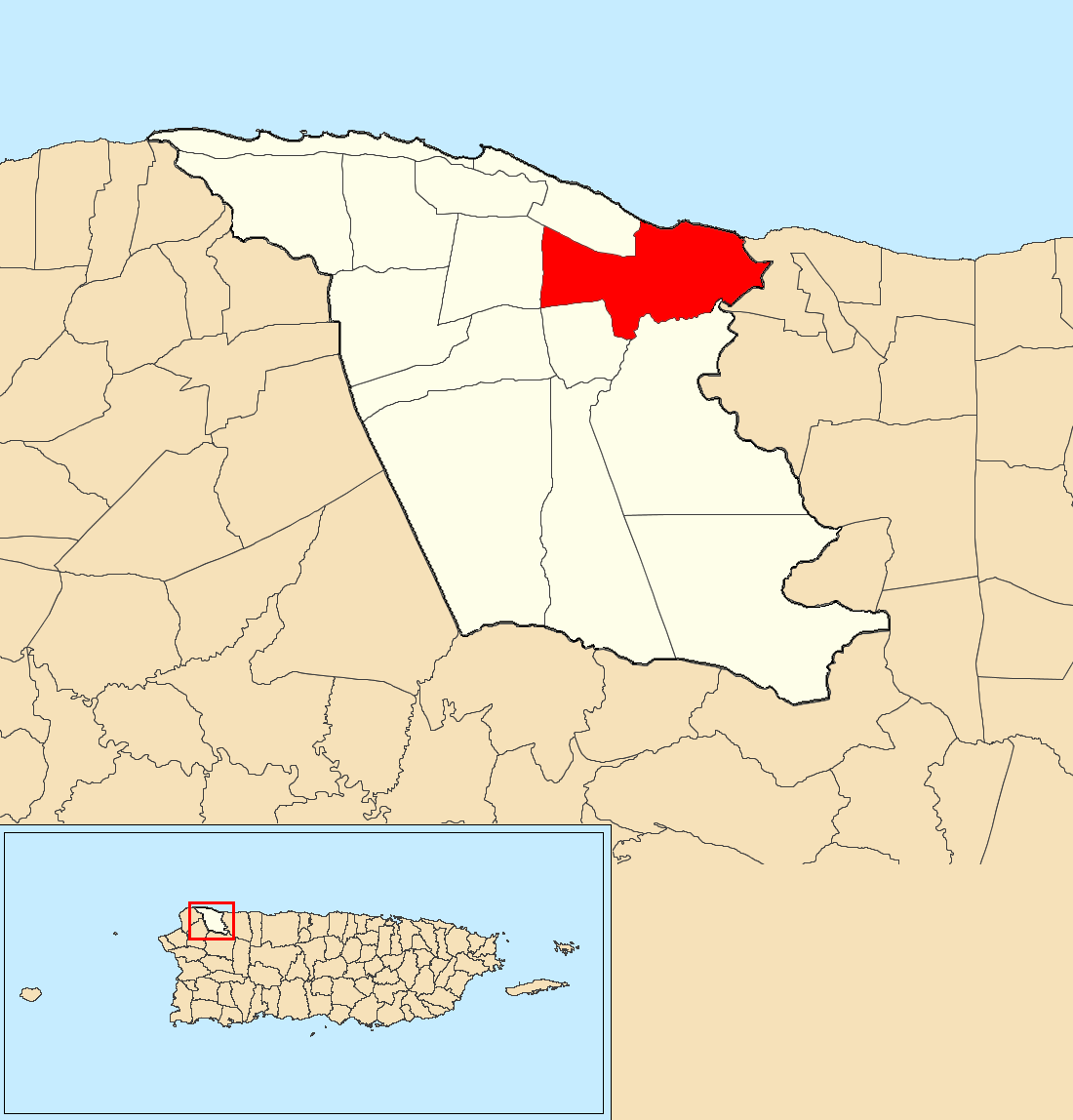
- Location of Coto within the municipality of Isabela shown in red

- Location of Puerto Rico
- Coordinates: 18°28′51″N 66°58′55″W
- Commonwealth: Puerto Rico
- Municipality: Isabela

Area
  - Total: 4.99 sq mi (12.9 km^{2})
  - Land: 4.38 sq mi (11.3 km^{2})
  - Water: 0.61 sq mi (1.6 km^{2})
- Elevation: 295 ft (90 m)

Population (2010)
  - Total: 3,575
  - Density: 816.2/sq mi (315.1/km^{2})
- Source: 2010 Census
- Time zone: UTC−4 (AST)

Coto is a barrio in the municipality of Isabela, Puerto Rico. Its population in 2010 was 3,575.

== History ==
Coto was in Spain's gazetteers until Puerto Rico was ceded by Spain in the aftermath of the Spanish–American War under the terms of the Treaty of Paris of 1898 and became an unincorporated territory of the United States. In 1899, the United States Department of War conducted a census of Puerto Rico finding that the population of Coto barrio was 1,349.

Historical population
Census	Pop.	Note	%±
1900	1,349		—
1910	1,567		16.2%
1920	1,646		5.0%
1930	1,787		8.6%
1940	1,892		5.9%
1950	2,125		12.3%
1960	2,234		5.1%
1970	2,429		8.7%
1980	2,864		17.9%
1990	3,262		13.9%
2000	3,799		16.5%
2010	3,575		−5.9%
U.S. Decennial Census; 1899 (shown as 1900) 1910-1930; 1930-1950 1980-2000 2010

== Gallery ==
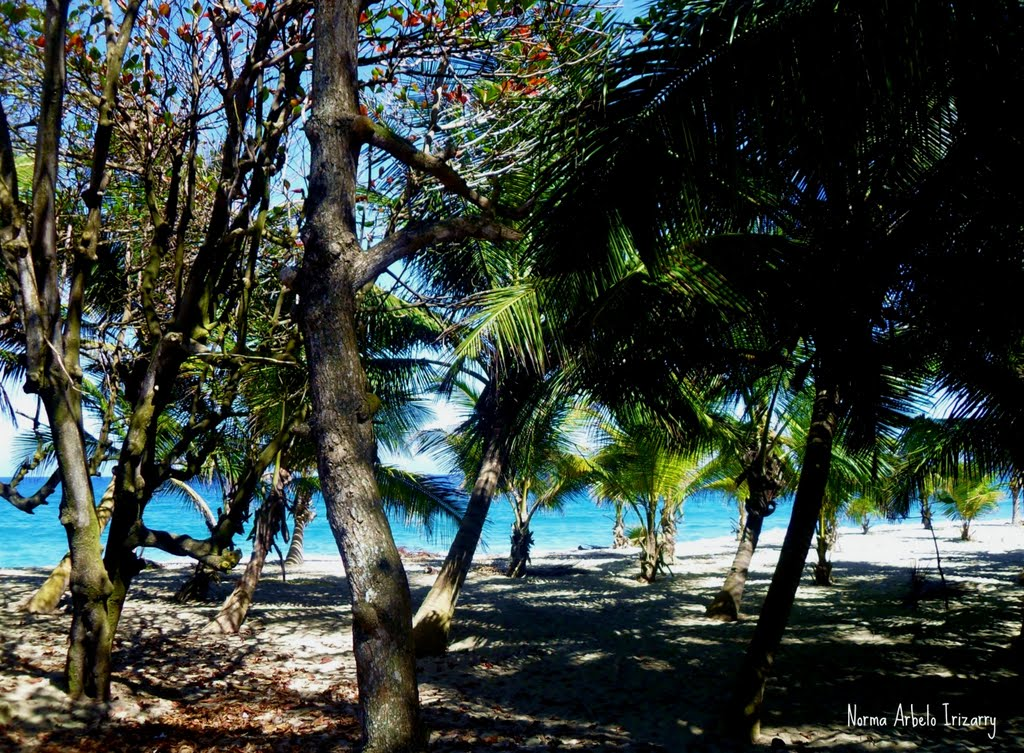
Beach in Coto

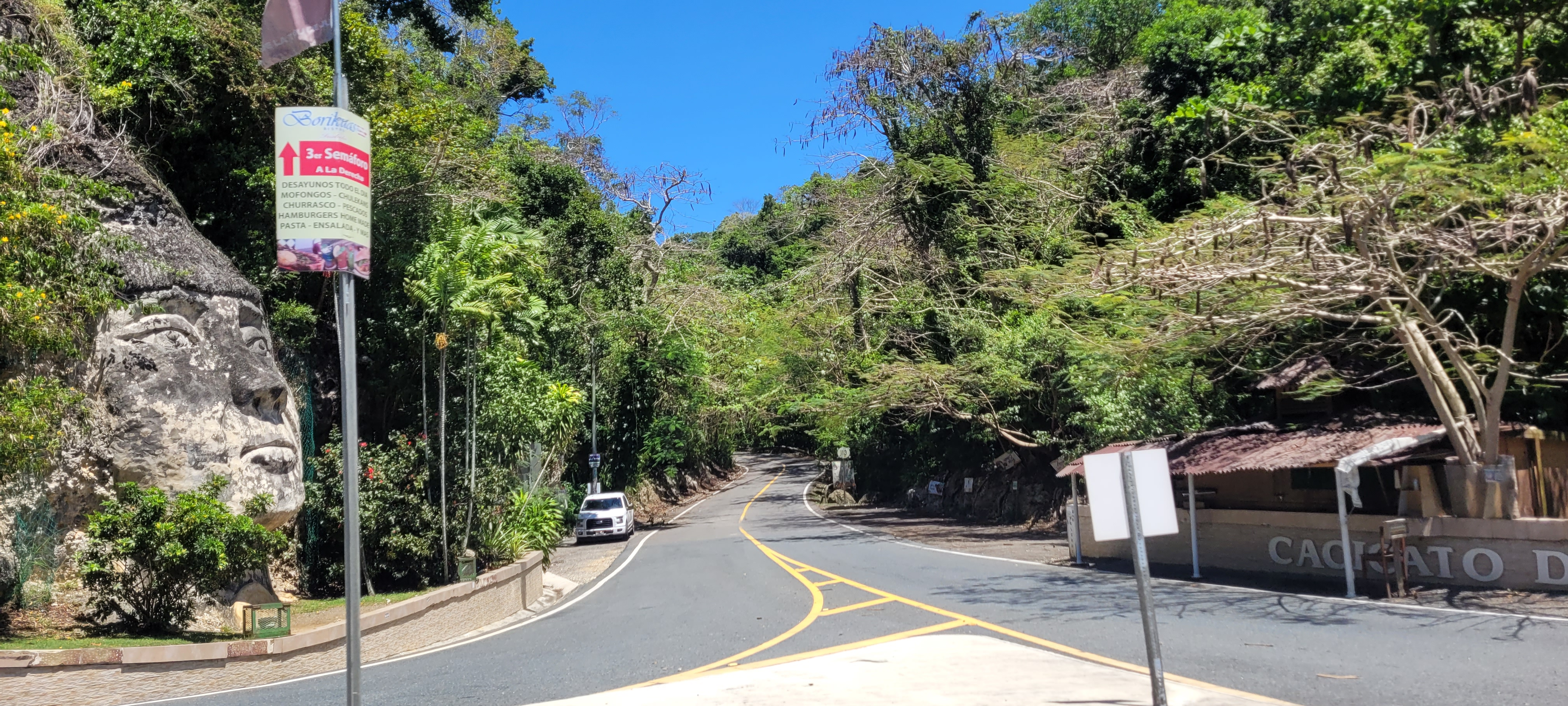
Puerto Rico Highway 113 in Coto

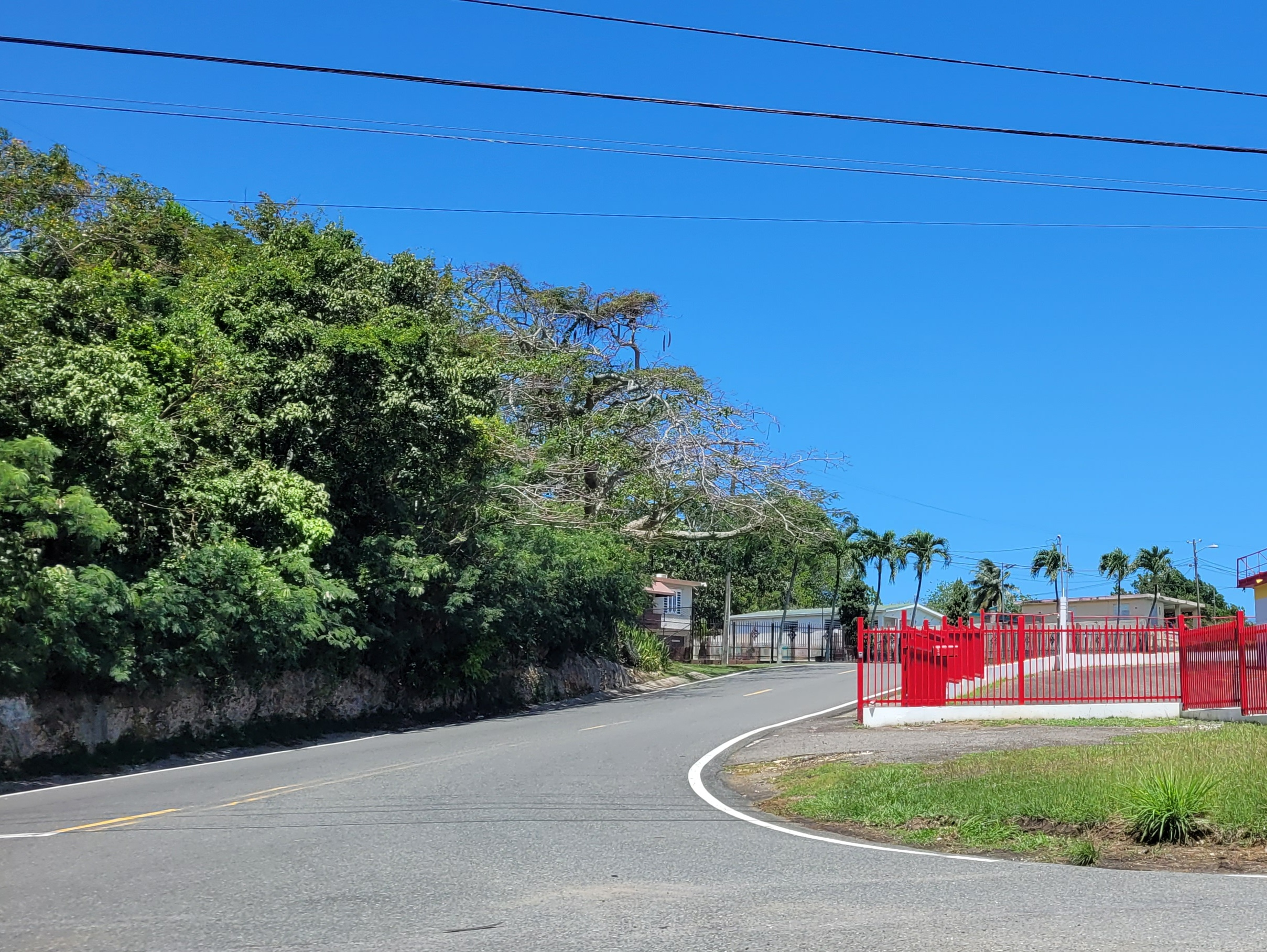
Puerto Rico Highway 446 in Coto

== See also ==
- List of communities in Puerto Rico
