= Diocese of Arecibo =

Latin Catholic jurisdiction in Puerto Rico

Coordinates: 18°28′21″N 66°42′57″W

Diocese of Arecibo Dioecesis Arecibensis Diócesis de Arecibo
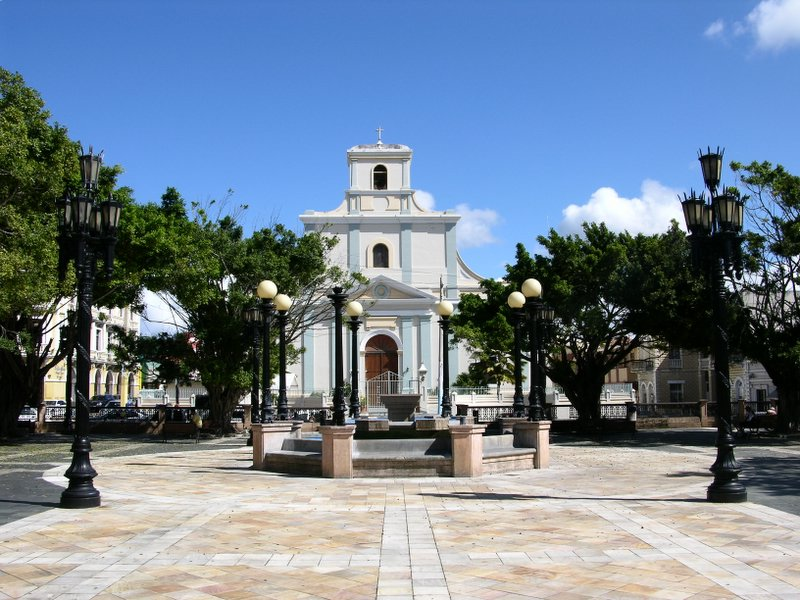
- Cathedral de San Felipe Apostol

- Coat of arms

Location
- Country: Puerto Rico
- Territory: Half of the northern portion of the island of Puerto Rico
- Ecclesiastical province: Province of San Juan de Puerto Rico

Statistics
- Area: 833 sq mi (2,160 km^{2})
- Population: Total; Catholics: (as of 2006); 607,000; 372,000 (61.3%)

Information
- Denomination: Catholic
- Sui iuris church: Latin Church
- Rite: Roman Rite
- Established: 30 April 1960 (66 years ago)
- Cathedral: Catedral de San Felipe Apóstol

Current leadership
- Pope: Leo XIV
- Bishop: Alberto Arturo Figueroa Morales
- Metropolitan Archbishop: Roberto González Nieves, O.F.M.
- Bishops emeritus: Daniel Fernández Torres

Map
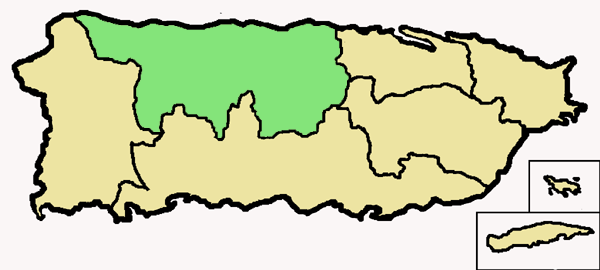

The Diocese of Arecibo (Latin: Dioecesis Arecibensis Spanish: Diócesis de Arecibo) is a diocese of the Catholic Church and consists of half of the northern portion of the island of Puerto Rico, a commonwealth of the United States. The mother church is the Catedral de San Felipe Apostol located in City of Arecibo.

== History ==
The See of Arecibo was canonically erected on 30 April 1960 and is a suffragan diocese in the ecclesiastical province of the metropolitan Archdiocese of San Juan de Puerto Rico. Its jurisdiction includes the municipalities of Isabela, Quebradillas, Camuy, Hatillo, Arecibo, Barceloneta, Florida, Manatí, Vega Baja, Vega Alta, Lares, Utuado, Ciales, Morovis, Corozal, and Orocovis.

=== San Juan Archdiocese bankruptcy ===
On 7 September 2018, a federal judge ruled that the bankruptcy filed by the Archdiocese of San Juan would also apply to every Catholic diocese in Puerto Rico, including Arecibo, and that all would now have their assets protected under Chapter 11.

== Bishops ==
The list of ordinaries (bishops of the diocese) and their terms of service:

1. Alfredo Méndez-Gonzalez, C.S.C. (1960–1974)
2. Miguel Rodriguez Rodriguez, C.Ss.R. (1974–1990)
3. Iñaki Mallona Txertudi, C.P. (1991–2010)
4. Daniel Fernández Torres, (2010–2022)
5. Alberto Arturo Figueroa Morales, (2022–)

=== Other priests of this diocese who became bishops ===
- Enrique Manuel Hernández Rivera, appointed auxiliary bishop of San Juan in 1979
- Alberto Arturo Figueroa Morales (priest here, 1990–1991), appointed auxiliary bishop of San Juan in 2019
