= Iglesia de Nuestra Señora de la Candelaria y San Matías =

Historic church in Manatí, Puerto Rico

- Church Nuestra Señora de la Candelaria y San Matías of Manatí
- U.S. National Register of Historic Places
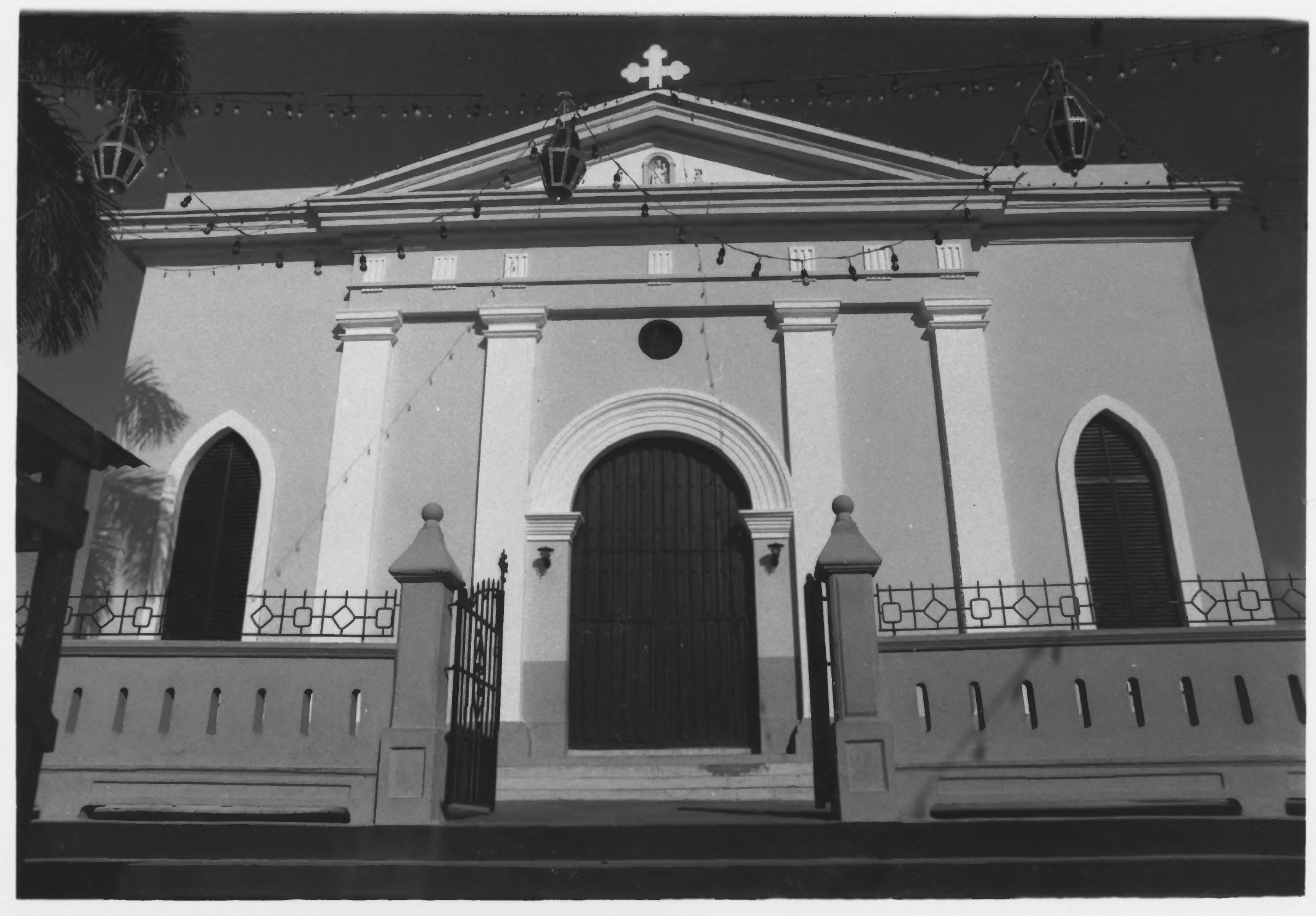
- The church in 1984

- Location within Puerto Rico Location within the Caribbean
- Location: Patriota Pozo St., Town Plaza; Manatí, Puerto Rico
- Coordinates: 18°25′38″N 66°29′33″W
- Built: 1729
- Engineer: Ramon Soler
- Architectural style: Spanish Colonial
- MPS: Historic Churches of Puerto Rico MPS
- NRHP reference No.: 84003130
- Added to NRHP: September 18, 1984

The Iglesia de Nuestra Señora de la Candelaria y San Matías (English: Church of Our Lady of the Presentation and Saint Matthias) is a church in the municipality of Manatí, Puerto Rico. It was built originally in 1729 and underwent major repairs in 1864 directed by engineer Ramon Soler.

It was listed on the U.S. National Register of Historic Places in 1984.

It is one of 31 churches reviewed for listing on the National Register in 1984.

== See also ==
- National Register of Historic Places listings in northern Puerto Rico
