= Baltasar López de Castro =

Spanish colonial official

Baltasar López de Castro (1550s - ?) was a Spanish colonial official who served with the Real Audiencia of Santo Domingo and later served as its Chief Bailiff. He is most well known for proposing to the Council of the Indies the plan that became the Devastations of Osorio.

== Early and personal life ==
López de Castro was born some time in the 1550s in Santo Domingo to Baltasar (or Nicolás) López Cornejo and María Cataño. He was baptized on 15 June 1559 at the Cathedral of Santo Domingo. His father held the hereditary office of escribano de cámara, scribe of the colony's Audiencia. After his father's death in 1569, López de Castro named officers to the post until he was able to take the job at the age of 21.

He was married to Sabrina de Sandoval and his son Baltasar López de Castro y Sandoval inherited from him the office of Chief Bailiff.

== Career ==
While still working as escribano de cámara, he also received the role of Alférez real, which came with a position on the cabildo of Santo Domingo, thereby bridging the royally appointed Audiencia and the local elites. He was one of 16 locals to ride out to resist Francis Drake's raid on Santo Domingo. In 1597, he was exiled from the city for four years because of improper language directed at one of the Oidors of the Audiencia. He went to Spain to plead his case before the Council of the Indies. While there, he also presented two memoriales regarding the state of the island of Hispaniola in a bid to gain influence and favor with the councillors. In the first memorial he listed the measures already taken the prevent smuggling, including patrolling galleys and judges assigned to prosecute cases, and measures done to control ranchers. In the second memorial he proposed relocating the towns of the north closer to the capital to solve an issue with the city's meat supply, allow for manpower to be concentrated for defense, and centralize control to prevent smuggling. He estimated that smuggling cost the crown 200,000 ducats a year.

He was not the first to suggest the idea of depopulations in Hispaniola; it had been ordered in 1573 but was ignored by the Audiencia. A request had already been written to the same council by Pedro Sáenz de Morquecho for the same measure. While not successful at first, a new council with appointments by the new king Philip III was receptive to the idea, and, bolstered by Agustín Dávila Padilla's claims of the Dutch bringing Protestant Bibles to the island, approved it in 1602.

López de Castro stayed in Seville for seven months, unable to find a ship, until he managed to leave in 1603. Arriving in Santo Domingo, he informed governor Antonio Osorio y Villegas about the depopulation order. Although López de Castro had requested command of the operation, it would really go to Osorio y Villegas to carry out with Gonzalo Mejías de Villalobos, Francisco Manso de Contreras, Marcos Núñez de Toledo being assigned to carry out the operation, while he was made secretario de la cámara (English: secretary of the chamber) of the Audiencia.

His contemporary, Friar Cipriano de Utrera, noted that López de Castro did not receive the job because of doubts of his competence. While in Santo Domingo, he requested rewards for his idea, including 1,000 slave licenses, compensation from the prison tax, and the job of Chief Bailiff of the Audiencia. In 1605, Osorio y Villegas recommended to the crown that he receive the awards, and López de Castro additionally requested a royal title like marquis, count, or adelantado. He received only the hereditary role of Chief Bailiff.

== Legacy ==
In early Dominican historiography, he was widely reviled and blamed for the misfortune of Santo Domingo and later the Dominican Republic. Emilio Rodríguez Demorizi made him a scapegoat and Américo Lugo considered him a traitor who did anything to advance his career. However, later historians observe that he was not the only one to suggest the depopulation measure, suggesting a degree of necessity.
