= Francisco Manso de Contreras =

Spanish colonial official

Francisco Manso de Contreras (died ≤1620) was a Spanish colonial official who, over his career, served on the Real Audiencia of Santo Domingo, the Real Audiencia of Panama, the Real Audiencia of Quito, and as mayor of the criminal court of the Real Audiencia of Mexico until his death. In his time in Santo Domingo he was embroiled in a bitter dispute with the governor, Antonio Osorio y Villegas.

== Early life ==
Francisco Manso de Contreras was born to a father of the same name, a Puerto Rican-born public notary on Margarita Island and Eugenia Simon. His parents had traveled to the Indies in 1577 after living in Spain.

== Career ==
Manso de Contreras first worked as a regidor, alcalde, and ordinary in Margarita before representing the island as procurator in Spain. At some point he was also governor of Santa Marta and Riohacha. While working in Spain, he heard about the plan promulgated by Baltasar López de Castro that would become the Devastations of Osorio from the Count of Lemos, then President of the Council of the Indies. Expecting a prominent role in executing the plan, Manso de Contreras enthusiastically supported the plan. In 1602 he was made prosecutor of the Audiencia of Santo Domingo, then oidor in 1603. After the arrival of Osorio y Villegas in 1605, Manso de Contreras, upset with not having as prominent role in the plan as he would have liked, changed to opposing it and the governor. The Real Audiencia voted three to four to prevent the plan, asking for clarification, but Osorio y Villegas overturned it. Manso de Contreras and Francisco Mejías de Villalobos, another judge, argued that the death of the previous archbisop before he could hear about the plan nullified its legitimacy.

=== Against the Devastations of Osorio ===
When the plan was made public, he ridiculed it and consistently tried to interfere. He requested a six month extension on the depopulation of Monte Cristi. Despite not assigning Manso de Contreras his apportioned role in the plan approved by the Council of the Indies, on account of his refusal to participate, Osorio y Villegas dispatched him to Cuba to bring back the residents of La Yaguana, who had fled during the depopulation. He did not board the ship to Cuba and instead went to Cartagena, allegedly for business interests. When he went to Cuba a month later, he began work as a judge on contraband cases and arrested smugglers in the jungle. He also worked with Pedro de Valdés to promulgate an amnesty for smugglers.

In 1605, Osorio y Villegas began collecting evidence of wrongdoing of both Manso de Contreras and Francisco Mejías de Villalobos, accusing Manso de Contreras of accepting bribes, helping relatives, and abusing women. Upon his return to Santo Domingo, he faced a legal challenge from an accuser he was not allowed to know of interfering in the depopulations. After Osorio y Villegas was succeeded as governor, Manso de Contreras filed more than 100 charges against him as well as through people working on his own behalf for issues of conduct during the depopulation (which he was exempt from the prosecution of) and personal affairs. The case was sent to the Council of Indies, who reviewed the case and did not pursue any punishment against Osorio y Villegas.

Amid the armadilla method of local forces defeating piracy and smuggling, in 1605 he was in command of three ships and two pataches. He garroted its master and pilot and hanged them from the yard arm.

=== After Santo Domingo ===
In 1608 he was appointed oidor of the Audiencia of Panama, where he was temporarily in charge of the government in 1615. He was transferred to the Real Audiencia in Quito in 1615. He became the mayor of the criminal court of the Audiencia of Mexico in 1616. In that role he died.

He was married to Felipa Villena, who is listed as his widow in 1620, meaning he died some time before then. He had at least two children, one son and one daughter.
