= Martín Vasquez de Arce =

17th-century Roman Catholic prelate

Most Reverend Martín Vasquez de Arce
- Bishop of Puerto Rico
- Church: Catholic Church
- Archdiocese: Diocese of Puerto Rico
- In office: 1599–1609
- Predecessor: Antonio Calderón de León
- Successor: Francisco Diaz de Cabrera y Córdoba

Personal details
- Born: Cuzco, Spain
- Died: January 13, 1609 San Juan, Puerto Rico

Martín Vasquez de Arce, O.P. (died January 13, 1609) was a Roman Catholic prelate who served as the Bishop of Puerto Rico (1599–1609).

== Biography ==
Martín Vasquez de Arce was born in Cuzco, Spain, said to have Inca blood from his mother's side. He was educated at College of Saint Thomas and ordained a priest in the Order of Preachers. He was elected prior of the Alcalá de los Gazules convent in 1594, and then as rector of the college and convent of the College of Saint Thomas. He rose to the presidency of the Council of Castile. In 1597 he was appointed by the King of Spain as Bishop of Puerto Rico and confirmed on August 18, 1599 by Pope Clement VIII. He entered into episcopacy at Margarita Island. While bishop, he was the Co-Consecrator of Juan Ramírez de Arellano, Bishop of Santiago de Guatemala, Juan Pérez de Espinosa, Bishop of Santiago de Chile, and Mateo Burgos Moraleja, Bishop of Pamplona.

After the English invasion of Puerto Rico, the island was in a poor state. Martín Vasquez de Arce set about reforming the system of Indian labor on the island, which was working them to death without pay. He also moved to bring the remaining highland Indians in to town. Vasquez de Arce also campaigned for a re-affirmation of the freedom of marriage, removing local rules preventing office holders from marrying Indian women. In 1602, he came into conflict with the governor of Puerto Rico, Sancho Ochoa de Castro. Having arrived on the same boat to Puerto Rico, they were at first friends, but he grew to dislike him for the negligence and misconduct he saw in his rule. He wrote a list of his abuses, which, with the corroboration of the San Juan city council, caused the governor to be sent away for trial.

He served as Bishop of Puerto Rico until his death on January 13, 1609.

== External links and additional sources ==
- Cheney, David M. "Archdiocese of San Juan de Puerto Rico". Catholic-Hierarchy.org. (for Chronology of Bishops) ^{[self-published]}
- Chow, Gabriel. "Metropolitan Archdiocese of San Juan de Puerto Rico". GCatholic.org. (for Chronology of Bishops) ^{[self-published]}

Religious titles
Preceded by Antonio Calderón de León	Bishop of Puerto Rico; 1599–1609	Succeeded by Francisco Diaz de Cabrera y Córdoba
