= Sancho Ochoa de Castro =

Governor of Puerto Rico from 1602-1608

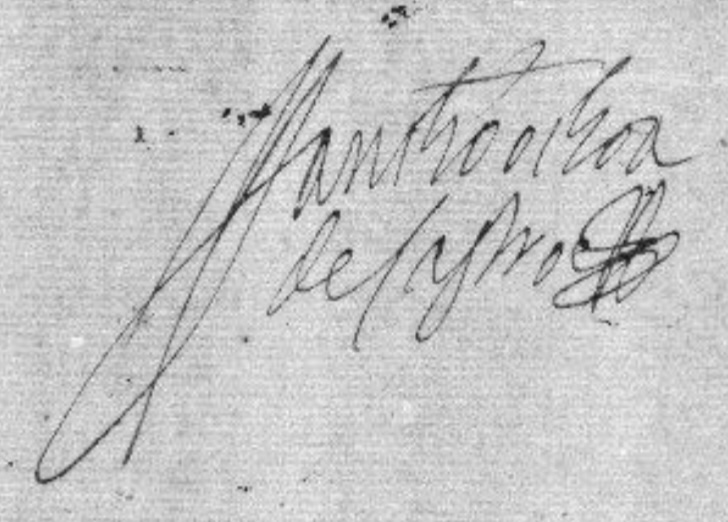
Ochoa de Castro's signature

Sancho Ochoa de Castro, alternately Sancho Ochoa de Chinchetru (died 1609) was a Spanish soldier who served as governor and captain general of Puerto Rico from 1602 to 1608.

== Early life ==
Ochoa de Castro was born to a royal official named Hernando Ochoa. In 1580 he joined the Spanish military. He served as a captain of galleons in the navy and became a lieutenant general of artillery in the fleet of Bernardino de Avellaneda. He was assigned office of a corregimiento in Peru but could not fulfill it because he was quickly given the office of governor of Puerto Rico. He arrived there on 7 August 1602.

He styled himself as the Count of Salvatierra.

== As governor ==
The previous governor Alonso de Mercado did little to repair the devastated city of San Juan after the English victory in the Battle of San Juan in 1598. In 1602, Ochoa de Castro set about building a new cabildo building, which was finished in 1608. He also built a fountain near the governors residence. He built an infirmary for soldiers, repaired the bridge connecting San Juan with the mainland. He resumed construction of the El Morro fortress in 1602, adding two bastions to it. He required soldiers to commit one day of labor out of the week towards building the fortress. Before he had become governor, he had asked Alonso de Vandelvira to recommend him a master builder of fortifications. He recommended Gonzalo Pérez, who was then working on La Casa Lonja, what would become the General Archive of the Indies. Ochoa de Castro then took him to work on El Morro, leaving on the same ship.

He sent a force of 159 soldiers under Francisco Ferrecuelo to Hispaniola to assist in the evictions carried out by Antonio Osorio y Villegas. In 1608, Ochoa de Castro forbade the growing of tobacco so that the industry could be concentrated on Cuba, although it was not being cultivated by anyone on the island yet. He forbade residents from catching pigeons which lived on an islet. He introduced a system of payment on credit for soldiers, which was maintained by later governors.

Ochoa de Castro required all landowners to present their passports when they went from the city to their estates. Salvador Brau called him a "vicious and capricious" soldier. who "mortified" the landowners with this policy. Terms for governors had recently been standardized to five years, but he received an extension and served for six.

Ochoa expressed frustration at his inability to carry out expulsions of illegally settled Italian and Portuguese because of the volume of their presence on the island. A fifth of Puerto Rico's whites were Portuguese. He also complained to the king about Vasquez de Arce allowing Portuguese clerics to the island.

== Trial and death ==
Ochoa de Castro had come to Puerto Rico on the same boat as its then new bishop, Martín Vasquez de Arce, and they had been friends at first. In time, Vazquez de Arce came to take issue with numerous policies of his administration, including his scandalous personal affairs. Among his crimes was the buying of merchandise stolen by pirates and sold it at an upcharge. His worst crime was erecting a gallows and hanging several of his enemies. Citing instances of impropriety and misbehavior, the bishop, with corroboration from the San Juan city council and residents, caused Ochoa to be sent away for trial to the Royal Indies Audience. His case was heard by judge Gonzalo Mejía de Villalobos. He was found innocent and with his term as governor up, he was appointed general of the fleet of New Spain and given a religious habit by the king. However, he died in 1609 in Spain before he could perform duties.
