= Francisco Diaz de Cabrera y Córdoba =

Most Reverend Francisco Diaz de Cabrera y Córdoba
- Bishop of Trujillo
- Church: Catholic Church
- Archdiocese: Diocese of Trujillo
- In office: 1614–1620
- Predecessor: Jeronimo de Carcamo
- Successor: Carlos Marcelo Corni Velazquez
- Previous post: Bishop of Puerto Rico (1611–1614)

Personal details
- Born: Córdoba, Spain
- Died: April 26, 1620 Trujillo, Peru

Francisco Diaz de Cabrera y Córdoba, O.P. (died April 26, 1620) was a Roman Catholic prelate who served as the Bishop of Trujillo (1614–1620) and the Bishop of Puerto Rico (1611–1614).

== Biography ==
Francisco Diaz de Cabrera y Córdoba was born in Córdoba, Spain and ordained a priest in the Order of Preachers. On August 17, 1611, he was appointed by the King of Spain and confirmed by Pope Paul V as Bishop of Puerto Rico. On October 6, 1614, he was appointed by the King of Spain and confirmed by Pope Paul V as Bishop of Trujillo. He served as Bishop of Trujillo until his death on April 26, 1620.

== External links and additional sources ==
- Cheney, David M. "Archdiocese of San Juan de Puerto Rico". Catholic-Hierarchy.org. (for Chronology of Bishops) ^{[self-published]}
- Chow, Gabriel. "Metropolitan Archdiocese of San Juan de Puerto Rico". GCatholic.org. (for Chronology of Bishops) ^{[self-published]}
- Cheney, David M. "Archdiocese of Trujillo". Catholic-Hierarchy.org. (for Chronology of Bishops) ^{[self-published]}
- Chow, Gabriel. "Metropolitan Archdiocese of Trujillo (Peru)". GCatholic.org. (for Chronology of Bishops) ^{[self-published]}

Religious titles
Preceded by Martín Vasquez de Arce	Bishop of Puerto Rico; 1611–1614	Succeeded by Pedro de Solier y Vargas
Preceded by Jeronimo de Carcamo	Bishop of Trujillo; 1614–1620	Succeeded by Carlos Marcelo Corni Velazquez
