= Antonio Osorio y Villegas =

Spanish nobleman, soldier and politician

Antonio Osorio y Villegas (also known as Antonio Osorio, Antonio de Osorio y Villegas or Antonio de Villegas y Osorio) (Villasandino, ca. 1543 - Atlantic Ocean, end March 1608) was a Spanish soldier who served as governor of the Spanish colony of Santo Domingo and as president of the Real Audiencia de Santo Domingo. He is remembered for executing, although he did not come up with the idea, of the Devastations of Osorio which cleared out the north of Hispaniola of legal settlements in the 1600s.

Although some historians place him as governor at another time earlier in the 16th century, no accounts survive of this supposed governorship.

== In the Old World ==
Osorio y Villegas was a Spanish infantryman with deployments throughout Europe. He fought at the Battle of Lepanto and in the galleys from 1571 to 1579 and had posts in the Mediterranean, Northern Europe, and Italy. He fought in Army of Flanders for 15 years, in which he was promoted to an officer role. He led 1,000 men in Cádiz to rebuild it after its 1596 sacking. He was made corregidor of Jerez de la Frontera, near Cádiz. He was next named governor of Santo Domingo and arrived in 1602. He was the brother of Diego de Osorio y Villegas and a member of the Order of Santiago.

== In the New World ==
In 1602, before Osorio y Villegas's appointment, the Spanish official Baltasar López de Castro proposed to the Council of Indies depopulating Hispaniola except for the southeast near the city of Santo Domingo as a way to stop the constant smuggling occurring on the island and centralize commerce. The idea was well-received and approved. Philip III sent a new Archbishop Agustín Dávila y Padilla to the island along with Osorio y Villegas in preparations to implement the plan.

After arriving in Santo Domingo with the plan and assuming his position in the Real Audiencia, three out of four of the judges there voted against the plan, seeking clarification. Two judges, Francisco Manso de Contreras and Francisco Mejías de Villalobos, argued additionally that carrying out the command was legally impermissible because of the death of the previous archbishop, who died before hearing about the plan. Osorio y Villegas overruled them and ordered the depopulations carried out on 19 May 1605. He called up 150 troops from Puerto Rico to assist in the endeavor. Osorio y Villegas declared the depopulation to be complete in 1606.

In 1606, seeking to limit the waste of resources, Osorio petitioned the crown for a limit to the number of slaves that slaveowners were allowed to keep in the house, both on account of the induced laziness of their masters as well as of the slaves. Osorio y Villegas also implemented a system of small local forces called armadillas to combat enemy corsairs, like his contemporary Pedro de Valdés in Cuba. In 1607 he learned he would be replaced by Diego Gómez de Sandoval. He requested and was granted impunity from lawsuits regarding his conduct in the depopulations.

=== After governorship ===
Although it was agreed that Osorio y Villegas was not to be tried on the topic of the depopulations, he faced more than one hundred charges of personal and political wrongdoing, including issues relating to the Devastations, by Francisco Manso de Contreras and those acting on his behalf. The case was sent to the Council of Indies, who reviewed the case and did not pursue any punishment against Osorio y Villegas. Nevertheless, Osorio y Villegas complained about Manso de Contreras' campaign against him. He died while at sea in 1608.

== Legacy ==
Osorio y Villegas is sometimes incorrectly said to have suggested the idea of the depopulations. For his commitment to the depopulations, Osorio y Villegas is one is the most maligned figure in Dominican history. Emilio Rodríguez Demorizi declared that his “ill-fated name should be execrated by future generations.” Manuel Arturo Peña Batlle called his efforts the "obsessions of a mad man" and the cause of the Dominican Republic's mixture of European and African heritage. Later histories portrayed him as ignorant, but responsible nonetheless.
