= Church of San Jorge (Alcalá de los Gazules) =

- Iglesia Parroquial de San Jorge (Spanish)
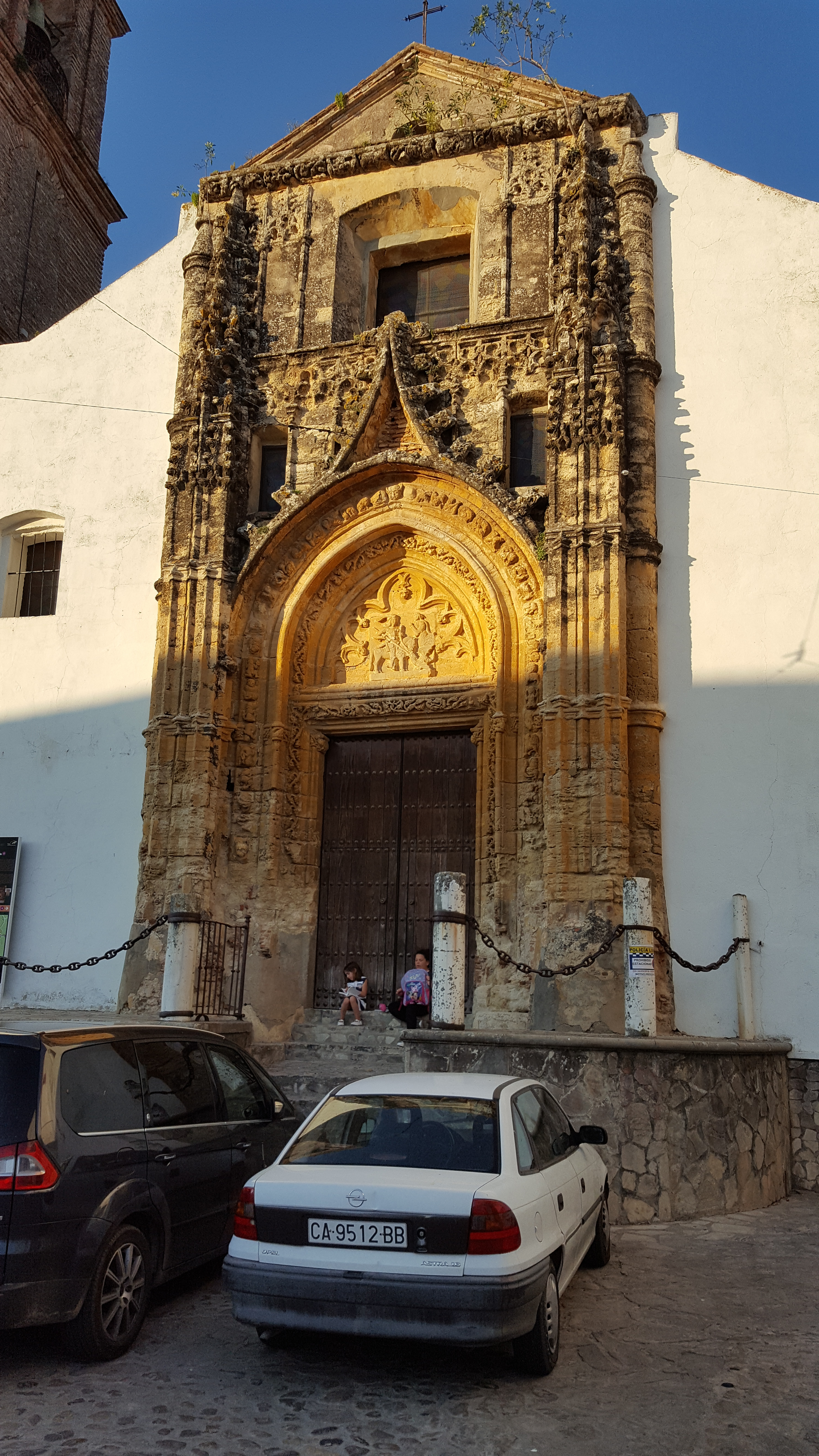

- Location within Spain
- 36.462890°N 5.723267°W
- Location: Alcalá de los Gazules, Spain

Spanish Cultural Heritage
- Official name: Iglesia Parroquial de San Jorge
- Type: Non-movable
- Criteria: Monument
- Designated: 2006
- Reference no.: RI-51-0006913

The Church of San Jorge (Spanish: Iglesia Parroquial de San Jorge) is a church located in Alcalá de los Gazules, Spain. It was declared Bien de Interés Cultural in 2006.
