= Alcalá de los Gazules =

- Municipality
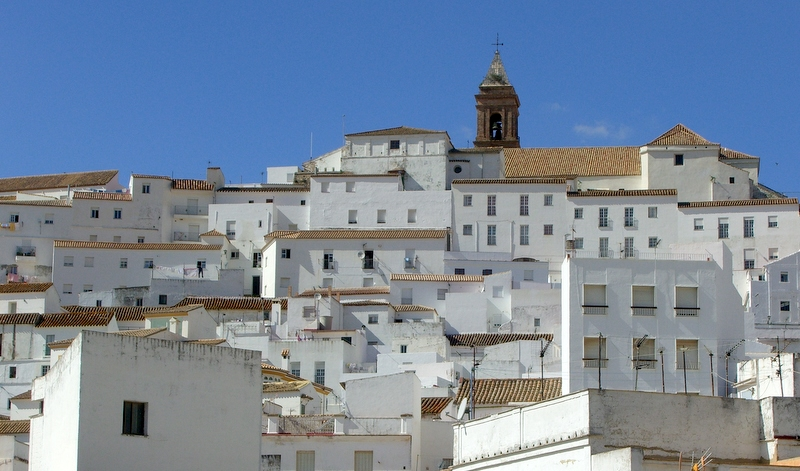

- Flag Coat of arms

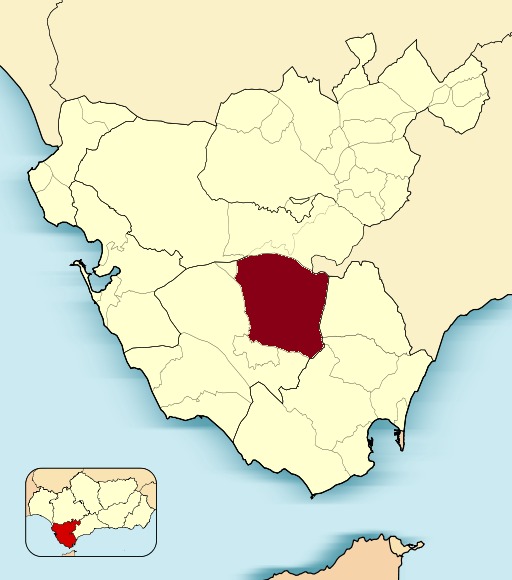
- Municipal location in the Province of Cádiz

- Location in the Province of Cádiz Location in Andalusia Location in Spain
- Coordinates: 36°28′N 5°43′W
- Country: Spain
- Autonomous community: Andalusia
- Province: Cádiz
- Comarca: La Janda

Government
  - Alcalde: Arsenio Jesús Cordero Domínguez

Area
  - Total: 479.59 km^{2} (185.17 sq mi)
- Elevation: 165 m (541 ft)

Population (2025-01-01)
  - Total: 5,230
  - Density: 10.9/km^{2} (28.2/sq mi)
- Demonyms: Alcalaíno, na
- Time zone: UTC+1 (CET)
  - Summer (DST): UTC+2 (CEST)
- Postal code: 11180
- Website: alcaladelosgazules.es

Alcalá de los Gazules is a city and municipality located in the province of Cádiz, Spain. According to the 2006 census, the town has a population of 5,633 inhabitants. Alcalá de los Gazules is situated in the Sierra de Cádiz.

Although not officially one of the pueblos blancos, Alcalá is still listed, since 1984, as having Artistic-Historic status.

== Demographics ==
Historical population
Year	Pop.	±%
1999	5,575	—
2000	5,563	−0.2%
2001	5,596	+0.6%
2002	5,565	−0.6%
2003	5,491	−1.3%
2004	5,590	+1.8%
2005	5,633	+0.8%
Source: INE (Spain)

== Notable sites ==
- Church of San Jorge
- Church of La Victoria

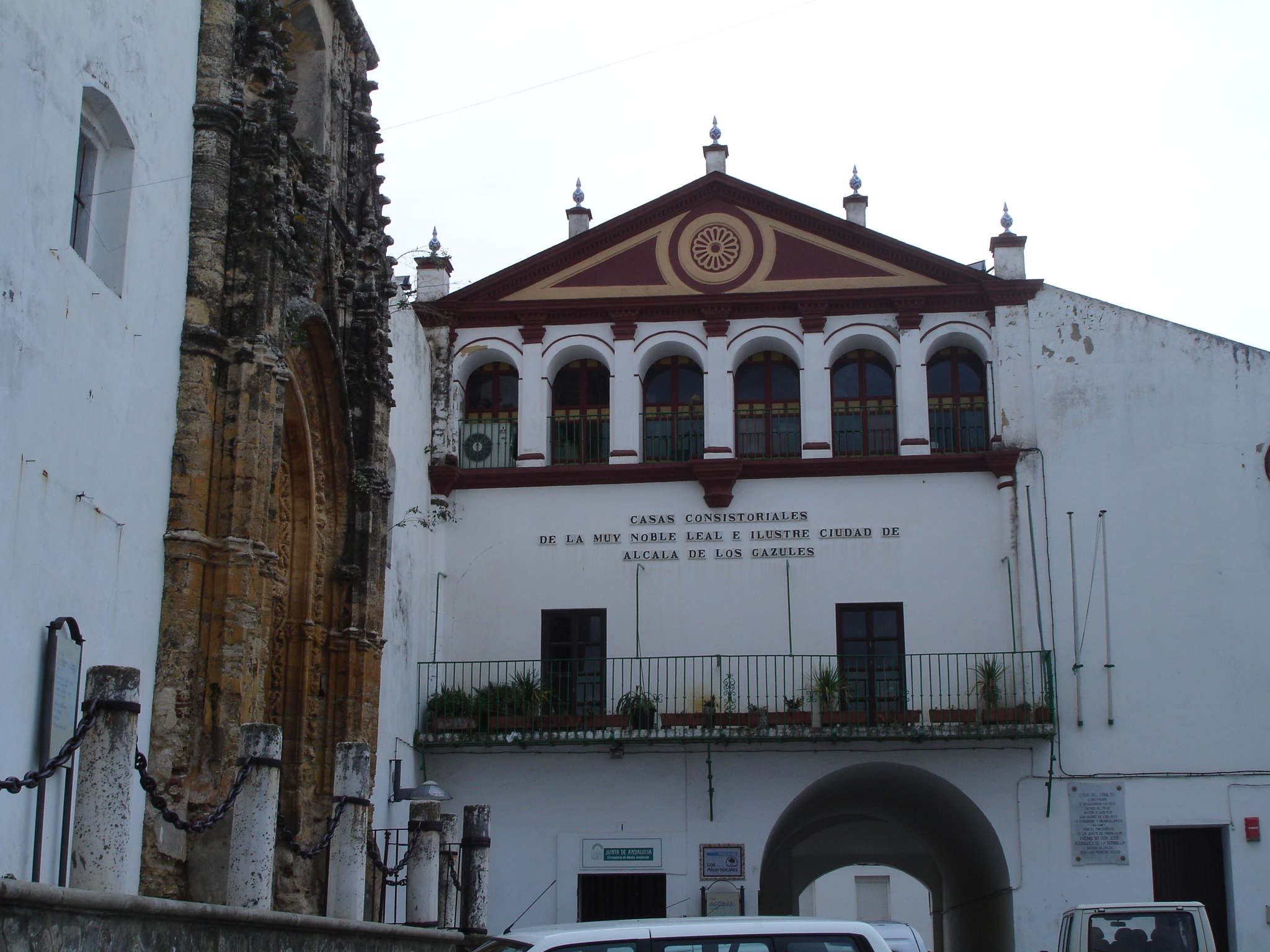
In front, the 16th-century Town Hall. On the left, Saint George's church

== Notable people ==
- Alejandro Sanz
- Bibiana Aído
- Alfonso Perales

== Gallery ==
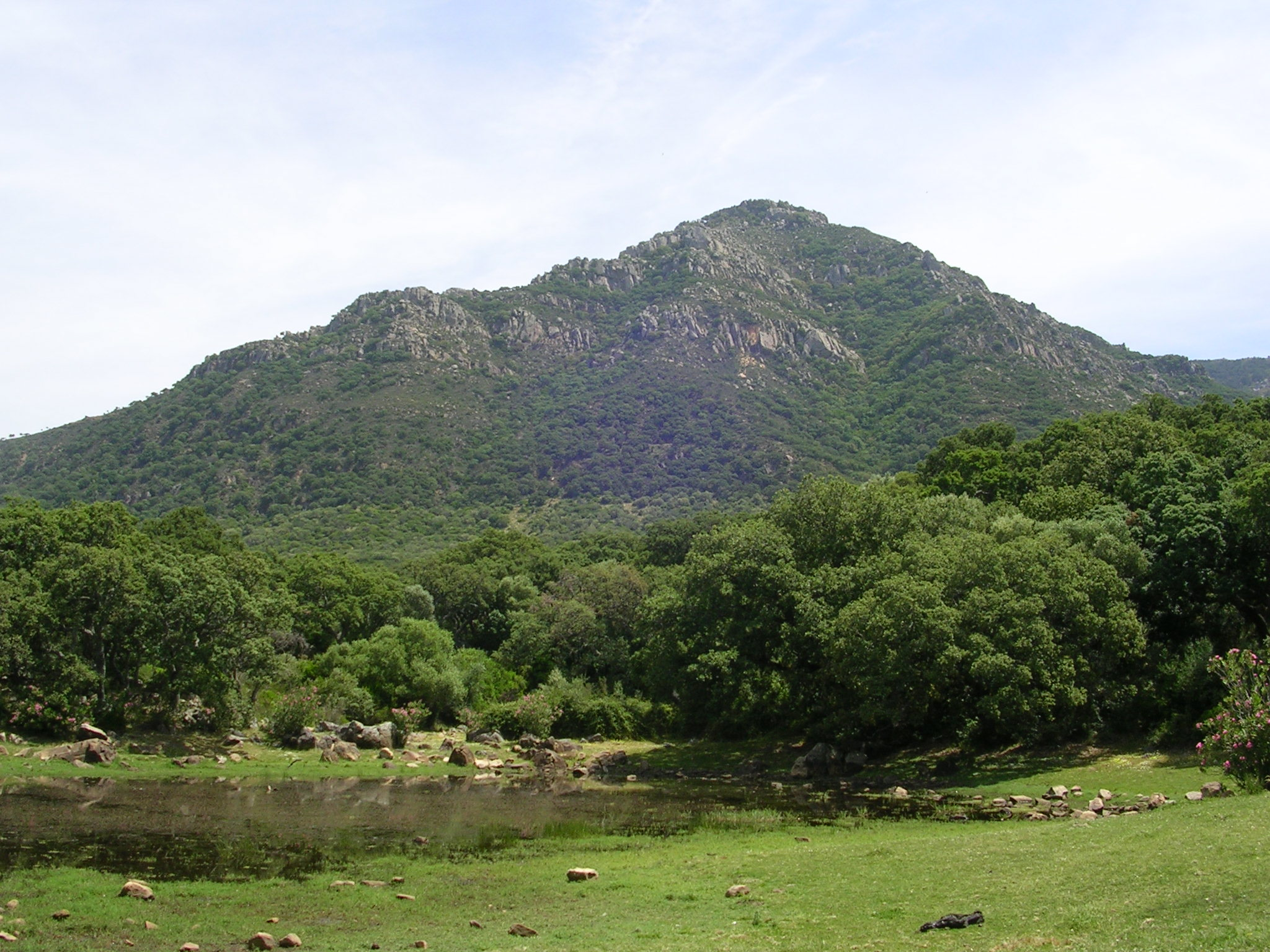
Los Alcornocales Natural Park

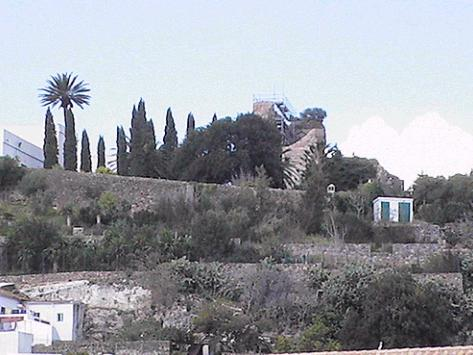
Castle

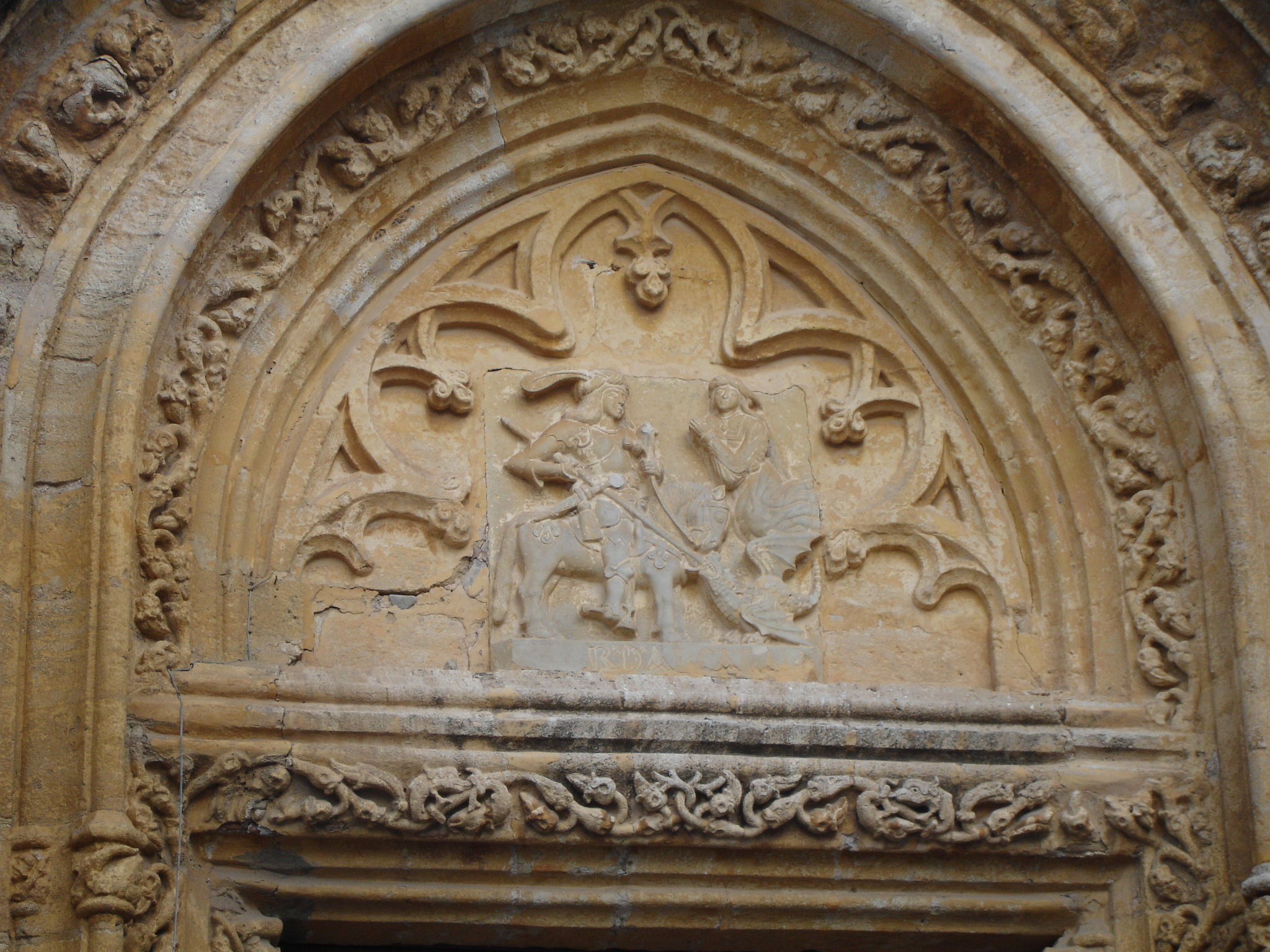
Church

== See also ==
- Los Alcornocales Natural Park
- List of municipalities in Cádiz
