= Devastations of Osorio =

Depopulation of western Hispaniola in 1605–1606

Situation of the island of Hispaniola (Note: The term Hispaniola is a Latin word whose literal meaning is "The Spanish One" in the feminine sense. Hispaniola is derived from Hispania, which was the name the Romans gave to the Iberian Peninsula, which today comprises Spain and Portugal. The name for Spain in Spanish (España) is derived from Hispania.) after the devastations of Osorio were carried out, with its western, central and northern areas completely depopulated.

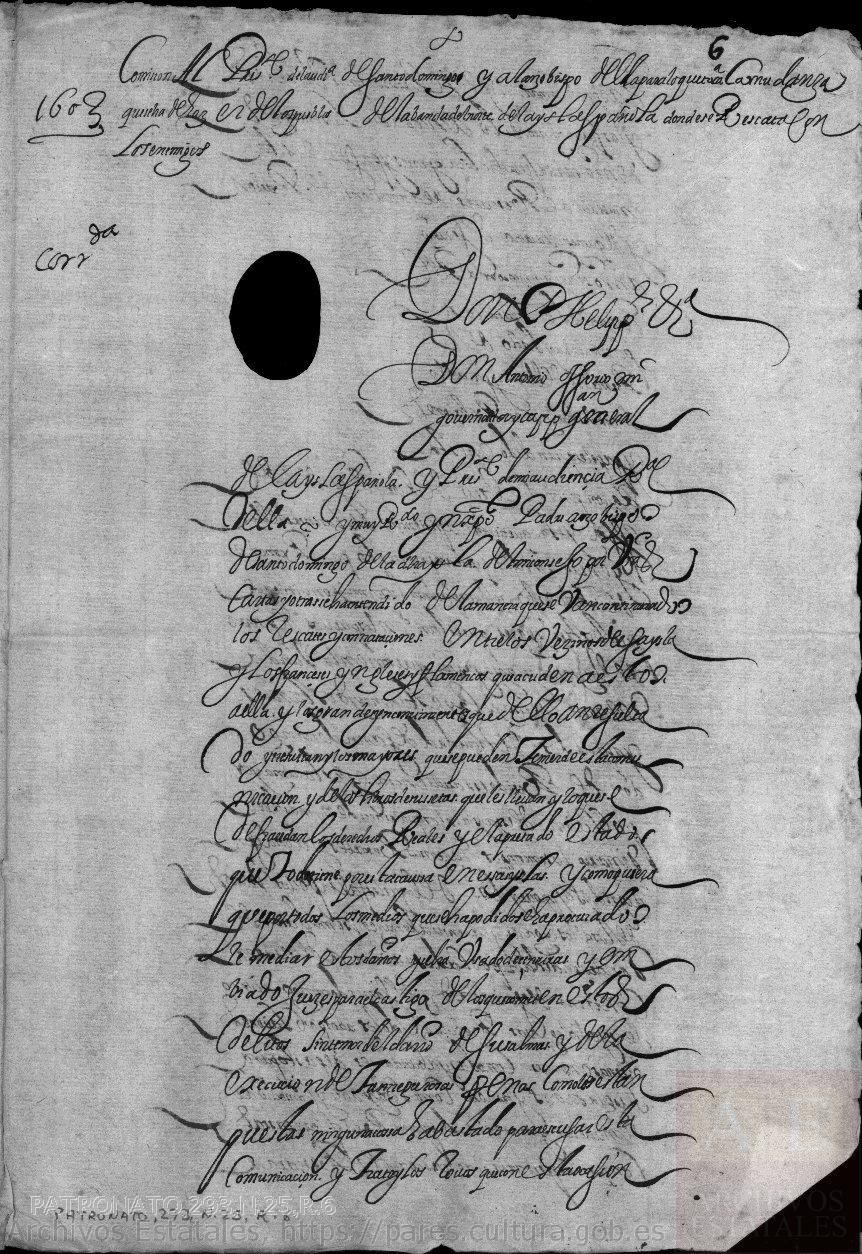
First page of the royal decree issued by Philip III of Spain, ordering Antonio de Osorio to carry out the devastations. The six-page decree is registered in the General Archive of the Indies in Seville, Andalusia, Spain.

The Devastations of Osorio (Spanish: Devastaciones de Osorio), also known as Depopulations of Hispaniola, were an event that occurred on the island of Hispaniola (today the Dominican Republic and Haiti) in the 17th century. The devastations took place as the result of the order given by King Philip III of Spain to the governor Antonio de Osorio (hence the name), to depopulate the western, central and northern regions of the Caribbean island of Hispaniola, by force if necessary, in order to end the smuggling that flourished in those areas. Osorio then implemented this order between 1605 and 1606.

Originally, the island of Hispaniola belonged entirely to Spain; however the Spanish crown believed that depopulating the western part of the island would put an end to the smuggling that so severely impacted the royal coffers. Unfortunately, the devastation made possible everything it had sought to prevent: the establishment of individuals from another nation in the western part of the island. The devastations were the event that allowed the French to establish themselves in western Hispaniola. The Spanish tried to expel the French from the western part of the island on several occasions, but were unsuccessful.

The French occupation initially gained a foothold on Tortuga Island under François Levasseur, but the colonization of the mainland was later consolidated under the administration of Bertrand d'Ogeron starting in 1665. Under d'Ogeron's leadership, nomadic buccaneers were transitioned into sedentary agricultural communities, effectively forming the basis of the French colony of Saint-Domingue. Shortly afterwards, the French West India Company began purchasing vast numbers of black slaves from Central and West Africa and bringing them to the west of the island to work on the coffee, cocoa, cotton, indigo, and sugarcane plantations. The French were so successful in seizing the western part of the island that they were already planning to take over the entire island from Spain. However, the Spanish managed to prevent this plan thanks to the swift execution of the Santo Domingo repopulations.

Ultimately, the Spanish concluded that it was impossible to expel the French and their large population of enslaved Africans. Finally, they ceded the western part of the island to the French in the Treaty of Rijswijk of 1697. However, this treaty did not establish a border between the two colonies, which led to territorial disputes between the Spanish and French. To establish peace, France and Spain decided to delineate a definitive border 80 years later in the Treaty of Aranjuez of 1777.

== History and causes ==
Map of the Captaincy General of Santo Domingo, (Named after a Spanish saint) before the devastations were carried out, when the island of Hispaniola was entirely territory of Spain (1492–1604). To the west can be seen the old Spanish towns of Lares de la Guahaba, Puerto Real de Bayajá, Villanueva de Jáquimo (or Aquino), Salvatierra de la Sabana, Santa María de la Yaguana and Santa María de la Verapaz. The map shown above is based on the original map of the island charted by Peter Martyr d'Anghiera in 1516. The coats of arms used to identify the towns on this map are the heraldic emblems granted to the island's villages by Queen Joanna I of Castile in the royal privilege of the year 1508.

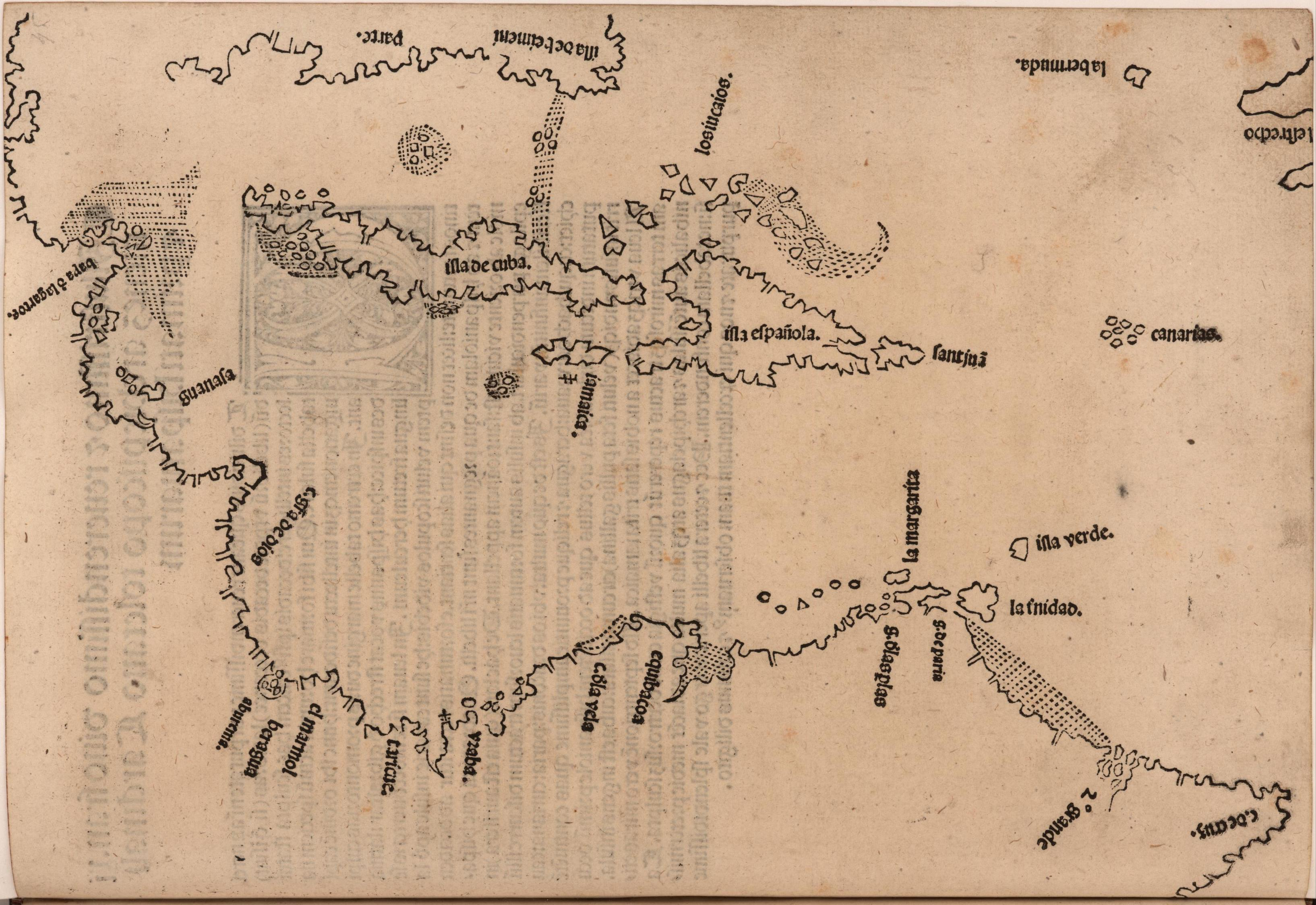
First map of the Caribbean Sea made by Peter Martyr d'Anghiera in 1511 (or 1514). In the center of the map, the island of Hispaniola can be seen undivided and without borders, all under Spanish sovereignty.

In 1604, the King of Spain, Philip III, observing the growing lack of Crown control in the north and western parts of the Captaincy General of Santo Domingo, granted Governor Antonio de Osorio and Archbishop Agustín Dávila y Padilla the power to take whatever action they deemed prudent in order to stop the incursion of foreign contraband as well as contact between Catholic subjects of the Crown and heretics. The origin of the problem was that the residents of Puerto Plata, Montecristi, Bayajá and Yaguana traded their products (especially cured meat and hides) with the French, the English and the Dutch, and received contraband goods in return.

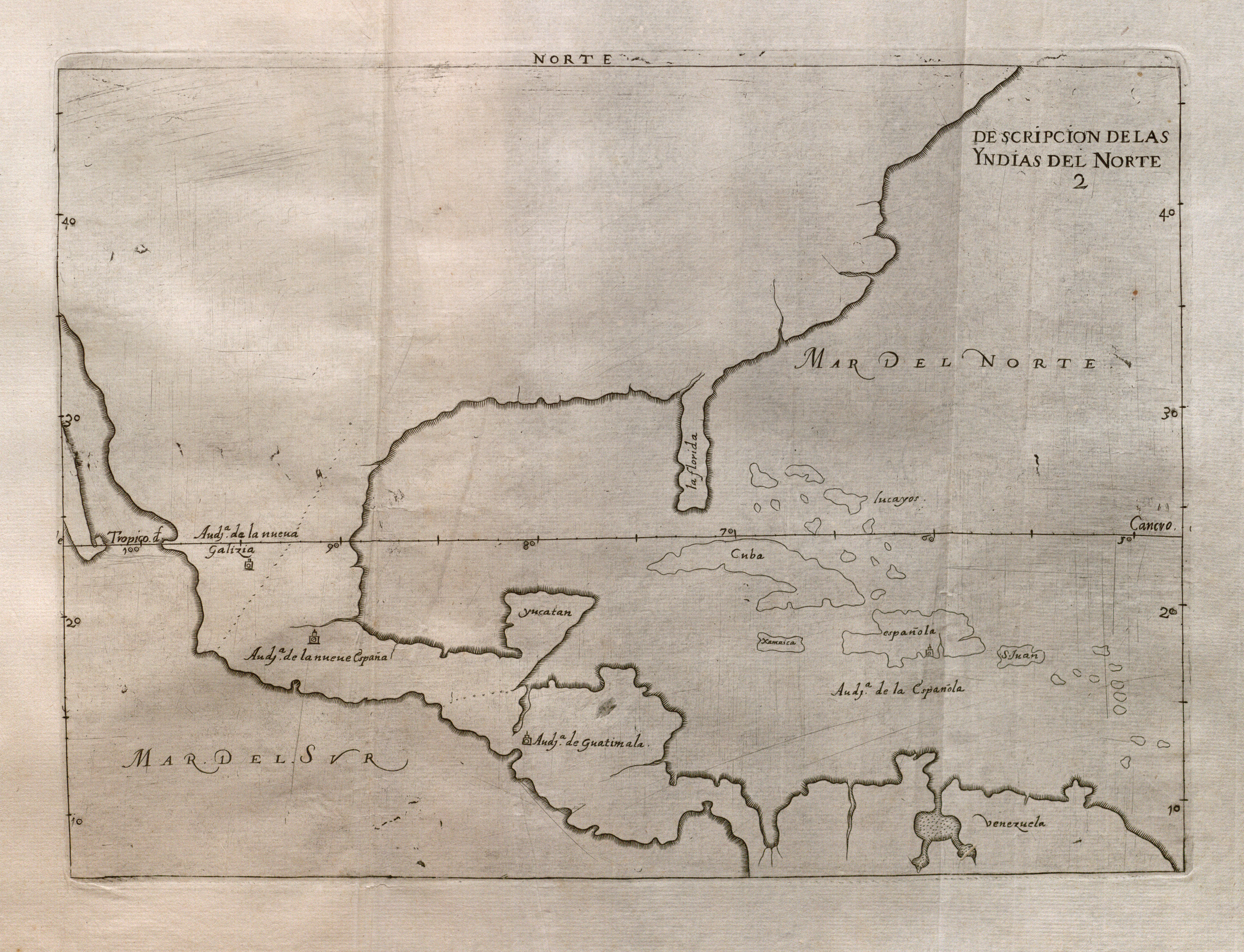
Map of North America made by Antonio de Herrera y Tordesillas in 1601, included in his work General History of the Deeds of the Castilians on the Islands and Mainland of the Ocean Sea Known as the West Indies, or Decades of Herrera. It shows the entire Spanish island of Santo Domingo under Spanish sovereignty, without borders or divisions.

This traffic had been carrying on from the middle of the 16th century and kept growing year by year. The king's order forced the officials to carry out the depopulation of the regions in which smuggling was rampant, so that the Crown's subjects could be moved to a location closer to the capital of the island, Santo Domingo. When the people of the northwest first heard about this order, the town councils began to raise petitions in which they requested the abolition of the measure. However, Governor Osorio, who upon the death of the archbishop Dávila y Padilla had to face the situation alone, decided to comply with the letter of the royal ordinance. In mid-February 1605, royal representatives left for the northern part of Hispaniola to proclaim that the people of the area would be forgiven crimes committed against the Spanish Crown resulting from the practice of trafficking with foreigners and heretics, but only under one condition: that they would collect all their personal belongings, slaves, cattle and other property, and move to the southeast, to locations pre-determined by the royal authorities of Santo Domingo. (Some officials of the Spanish audiencia tried to suppress the royal order, since their own smuggling interests would also be affected.)

The population of the north resisted and Osorio had to ask for reinforcements to comply with the royal order. The help came from the governor Sancho Ochoa de Castro, who in September of that same year 1605 sent an infantry company to Santo Domingo to help out the forces of Hispaniola. The contingent, composed of 159 soldiers under the command of Captain Francisco Ferrecuelo, went to the north of the island, where the orders of Osorio were forcibly imposed, and the residents of the region obliged to abandon their farms and homesteads. In order to achieve their objective, the soldiers destroyed sugar plantations, burned huts, ranches, haciendas and churches, and dismantled everything that the villagers needed to live in those places. The main depopulated areas were Puerto Plata, Montecristi, Bayajá and Yaguana. At the end of January 1606, Antonio de Osorio wrote to the king, communicating that the devastation had ended and that he only needed to go through the herds of cattle of the north, and those of Santiago, San Juan and Azua. The process was however delayed until the middle of the year. Eventually, the governor established a border that stretched from Azua in the south all the way to the north coast, and prohibited the Hispanic inhabitants from crossing it. The inhabitants of Bayajá and Yaguana were concentrated in a new town that received the name of Bayaguana, and the inhabitants of Montecristi and Puerto Plata were relocated to Monte Plata.

== Consequences ==
=== Fall into poverty ===
The destruction of some 120 cattle ranches, totaling more than 100,000 head of cattle, including cows, pigs, and horses, proved disastrous. Only 15% of the cattle could be moved to the new settlements, while the rest were abandoned. Within a short time, these herds became wild. Furthermore, the destruction of the sugar mills accelerated the decline of the sugar industry, which, combined with the loss of livestock and sugarcane and ginger plantations, increased poverty on the island and pushed Santo Domingo to the margins of colonial trade. The depopulation of the western and northern areas of Hispaniola was exploited by runaway slaves who, fleeing their masters, created communities in those regions. The runaway slaves came not only from the island itself but also from the neighboring captaincies of Cuba and Puerto Rico.

Dominicans who could afford to leave the island did so, going to Cuba, Puerto Rico, New Spain, or New Granada. Only those Dominicans who, due to lack of resources, could not emigrate, or those who, due to close ties and obligations, could not abandon it, remained on Hispaniola.

The misery that followed the Devastations of Osorio also affected Hispaniola's tax revenues, to the point that they were no longer enough to cover public expenses or the salaries of the soldiers in the Santo Domingo garrison.

In response, King Philip III ordered the authorities of the Viceroyalty of New Spain to allocate a portion of their tax revenues to financially assist Santo Domingo. This allocation of money, officially known as "situado," came directly from the Royal Treasury of Mexico City. This economic aid took longer than expected to reach Santo Domingo, sometimes even months late, resulting in misery among the Dominicans and reducing economic activities to the simple exchange of the scarce goods produced on the island.

=== Loss of territories ===
The devastation had catastrophic political, economic, and social consequences for the Spanish, including their loss of the territories in the west of the island. The depopulation of western Hispaniola did not prevent these territories from being entirely abandoned, as the Crown would have wished. Instead, following the devastation, adventurers from various countries attempted to take over the western part of the island.

== French occupation of the uninhabited west of the island ==
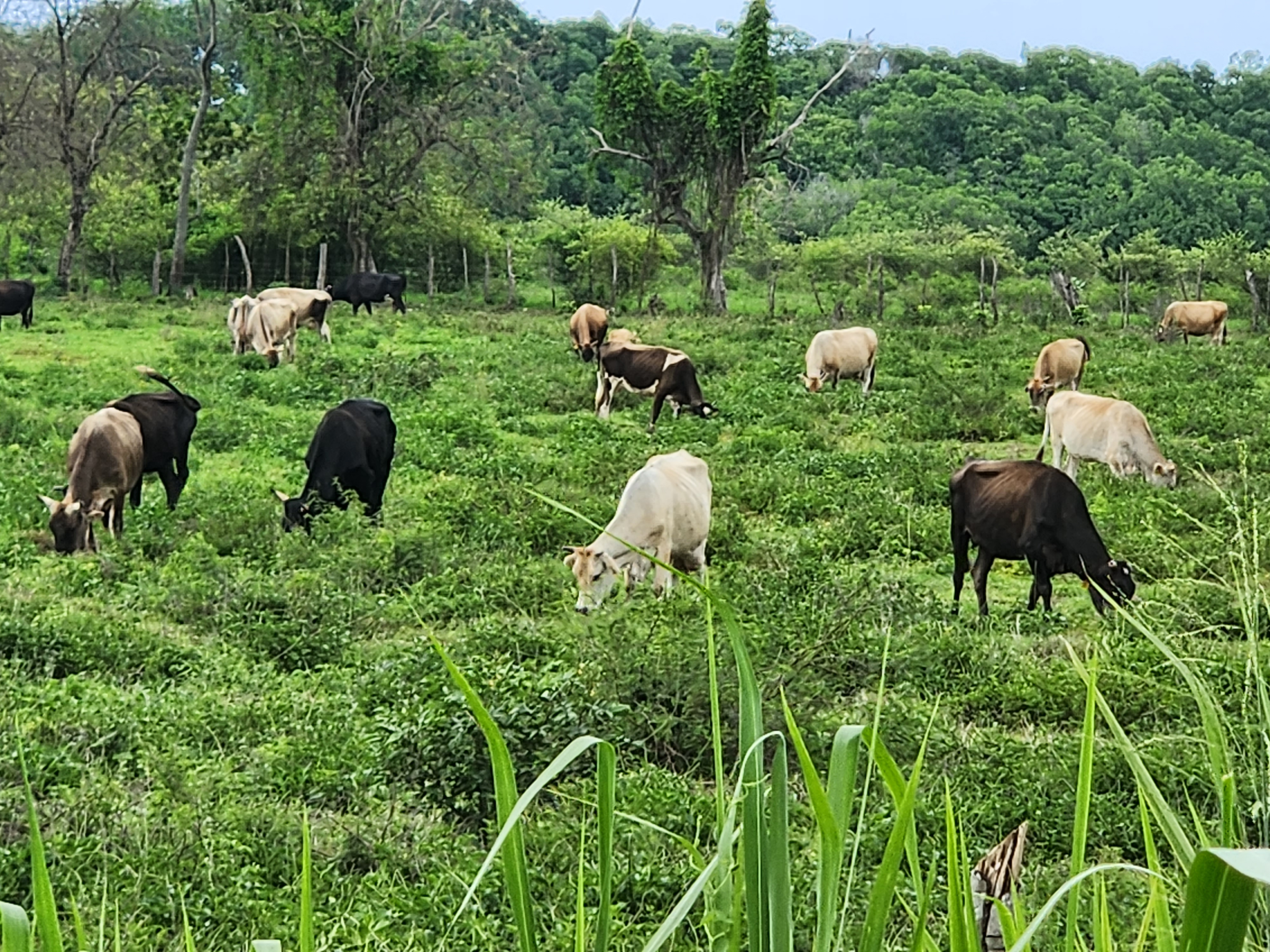
"... hundreds of thousands of cattle and pigs roamed through rich grasslands and forests crisscrossed by crystal-clear rivers. This was the western part of Hispaniola."

The French occupation of the unpopulated western part of Hispaniola began with a group of English and French adventurers who had previously settled on the island of Saint Christopher under the leadership of the English explorer Thomas Warner and the French privateer Pierre Belain d'Esnambuc. By 1620, all the Caribbean islands were still Spanish territories, including Saint Christopher.

In 1629, a fleet of Spanish warships commanded by Fadrique de Toledo was sent to the island to destroy the Anglo-French adventurers occupying it. The Spanish attack was devastating; many of these adventurers were captured or killed. Others managed to save their lives by escaping to other parts of the Antilles.

Thus, this first group of Anglo-French fugitives ended up in the abandoned western part of Hispaniola in 1630, first making landfall on the mainland on Tortuga Island. Days later, they crossed to the northwest coast of Santo Domingo Island (known among them as Grand Terre or Grande Ile) and there they discovered astonishing numbers of wild livestock — cows, pigs, horses, and mules — grazing in areas where not a single person was living.

They decided to settle on Tortuga, as the island's topography made it a natural fortress.

The invaders organized themselves into "classes" based on their activities:

- Buccaneers: They hunted wild cows, mules, and horses to sell their furs to English and French ships in the area. They hunted pigs for their smoked meat. These were the majority group, due to the abundance of cattle.
- Filibusters: who were essentially pirates, raided Spanish ships that crossed near the island in skiffs.
- Inhabitants: They dedicated themselves to farming, fishing, and lumbering.

== Impact of devastation throughout the island's history ==
The island before the arrival of Columbus, showing the Chiefdoms of Hispaniola. Upon the arrival of the Spanish to the island, it is estimated that there was a population of 3 million Taino Indians. However, by 1547, only 150 Taino Indians remained on the island.

Spanish penetration into the Island.

Captaincy General of Santo Domingo, territory of the Spanish Empire, with the cities founded by the genoese explorer Christopher Columbus, and the spanish explorers Bartholomew Columbus, Nicolás de Ovando, Diego Velázquez de Cuéllar and Juan de Esquivel.

Situation of the smuggling crisis on the island of Hispaniola or Santo Domingo 1570-1604 - Smugglers liked to operate in the western part of Hispaniola away from Santo Domingo, the island's capital city, because that was where the royal accountants and auditors were based.

The Devastations of Osorio, The Crown ordered the depopulation of the western-central part of the island as a radical measure to end smuggling.

The repopulations of Santo Domingo: Spaniards occupy empty territories in strategic areas to prevent the French from taking over the entire island.

== Documents ==
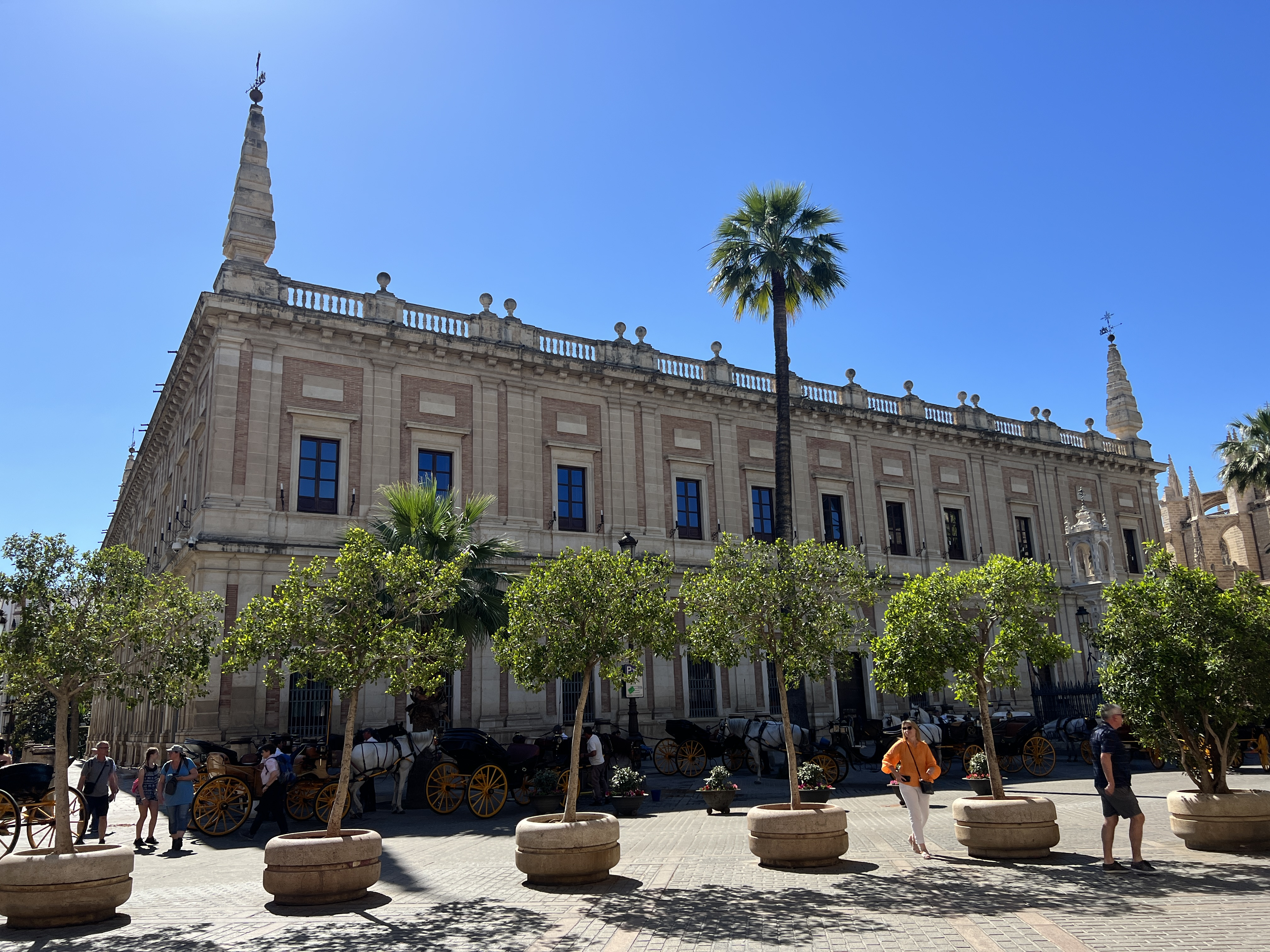
Photograph of the General Archive of the Indies. Created by King Charles III in 1785 to centralize and register all documentation related to the administration of Spanish overseas territories. This archive contains numerous documents related to Hispaniola, including records linked to the Devastations of Osorio.

=== Relocation commission ===
Royal Decree commissioning the civil and ecclesiastical authorities of Santo Domingo on the Island of Hispaniola in the relocation that must be made of the towns on the north side of the island where trade is conducted with the enemy.

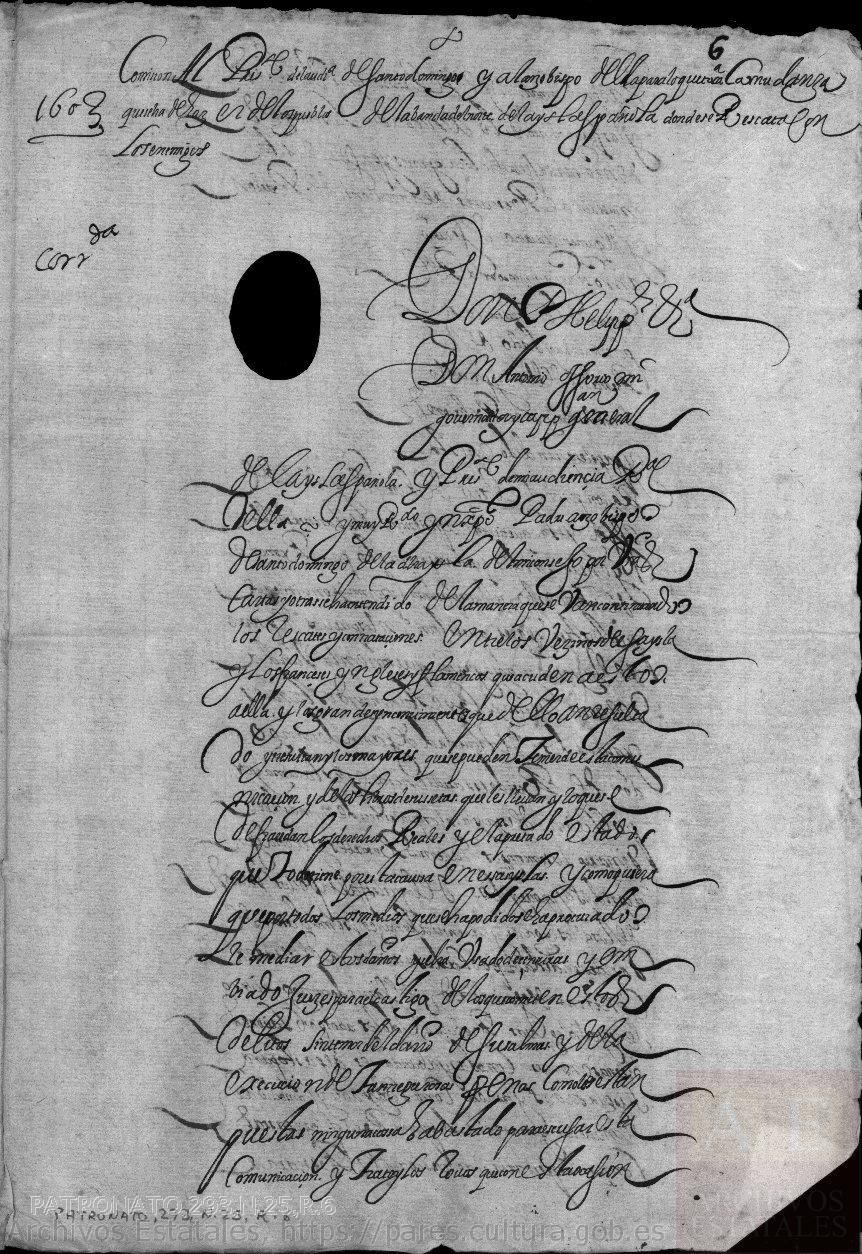

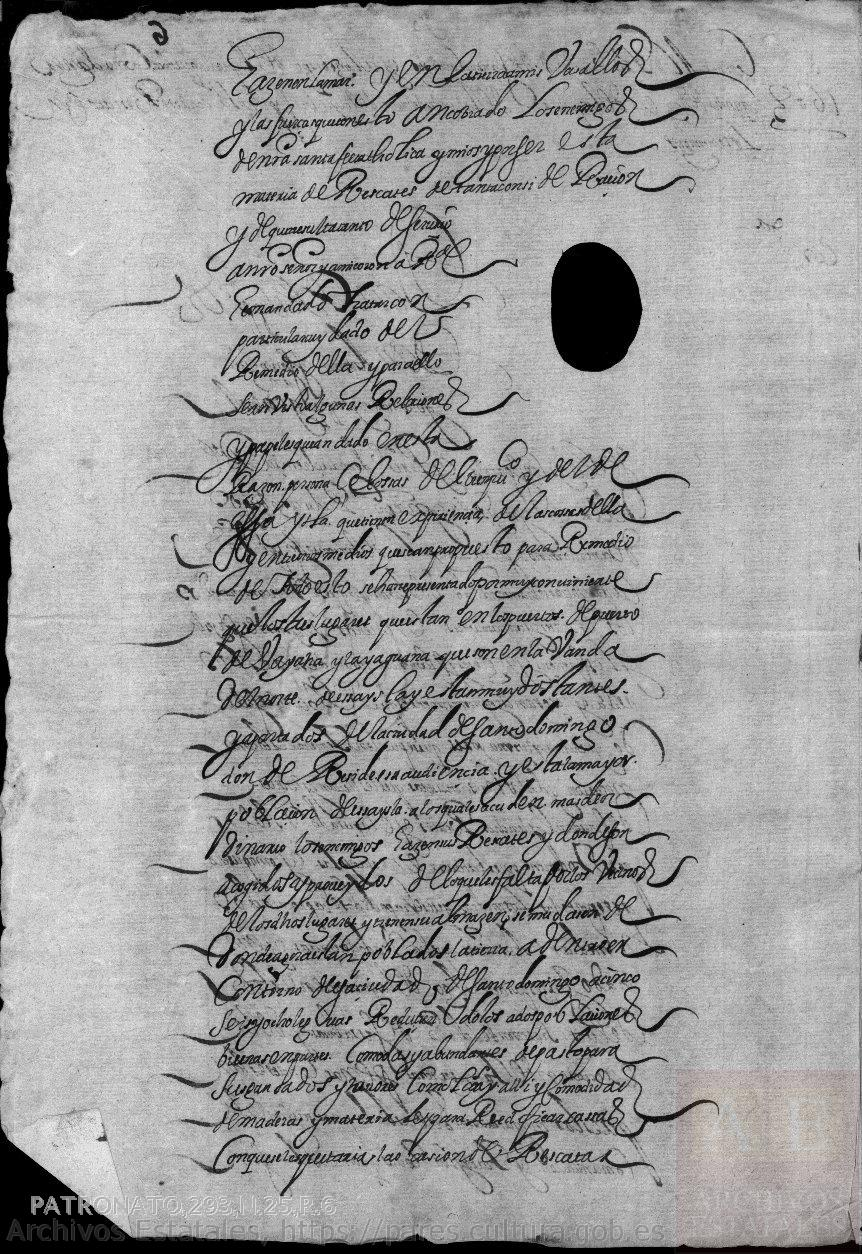

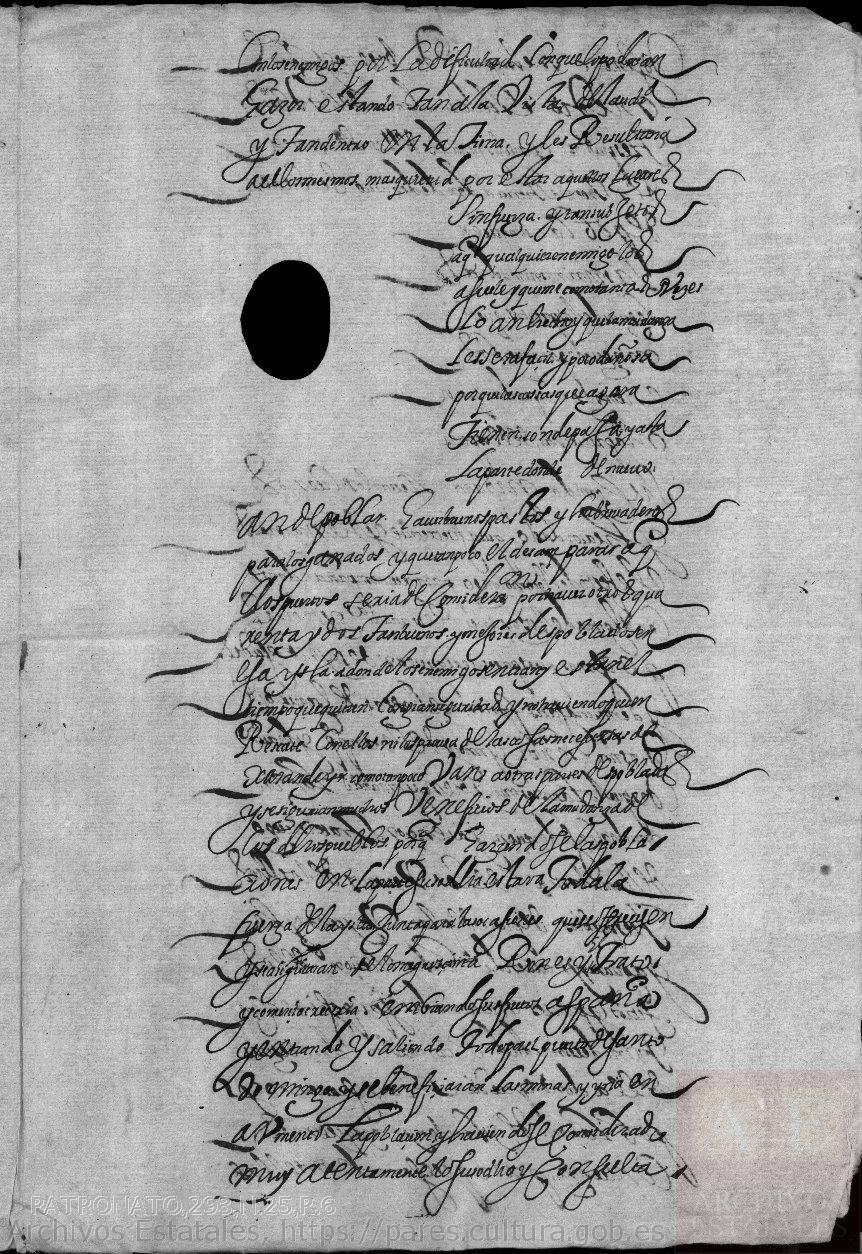

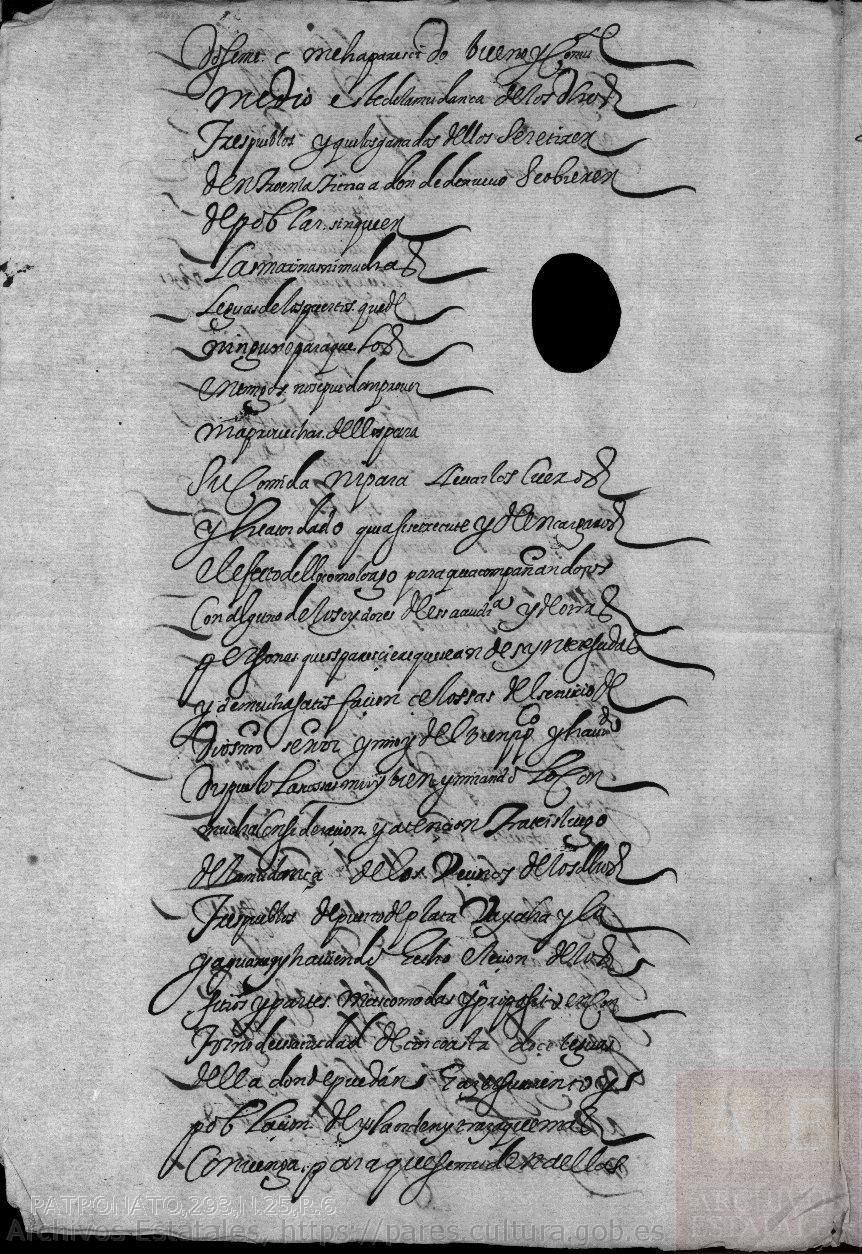

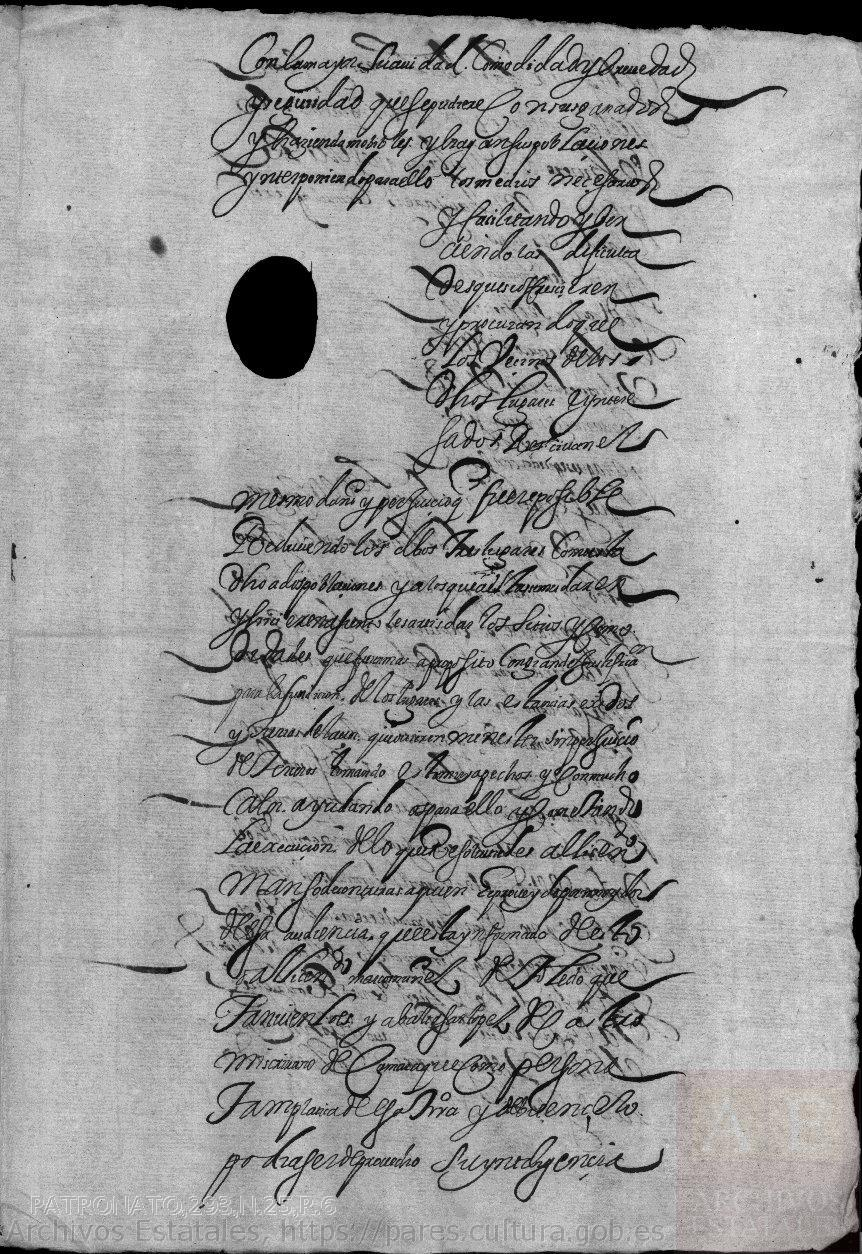

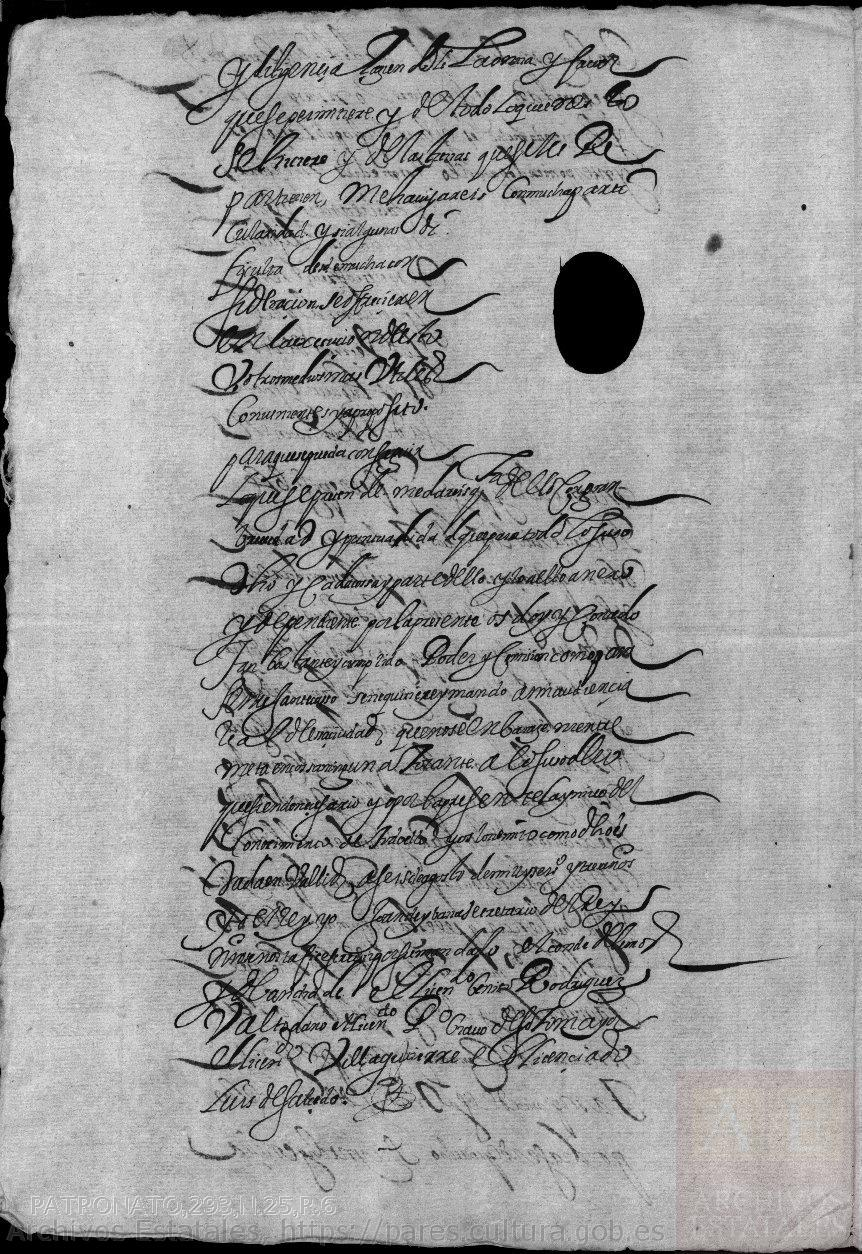

Wikisource holds a transcription of this decree.

=== Royal Dispatch of Philip III to Antonio Osorio ===
Royal Decree to Antonio Osorio, President of the Audiencia of Santo Domingo, ordering the transfer that should be made of the populations that are in Puerto de Plata, Bayajá and La Yaguana, located on the North Bank of the island of Hispaniola, inland, reducing them to two populations, and establishing the pardon of the guilty who are reduced to them.

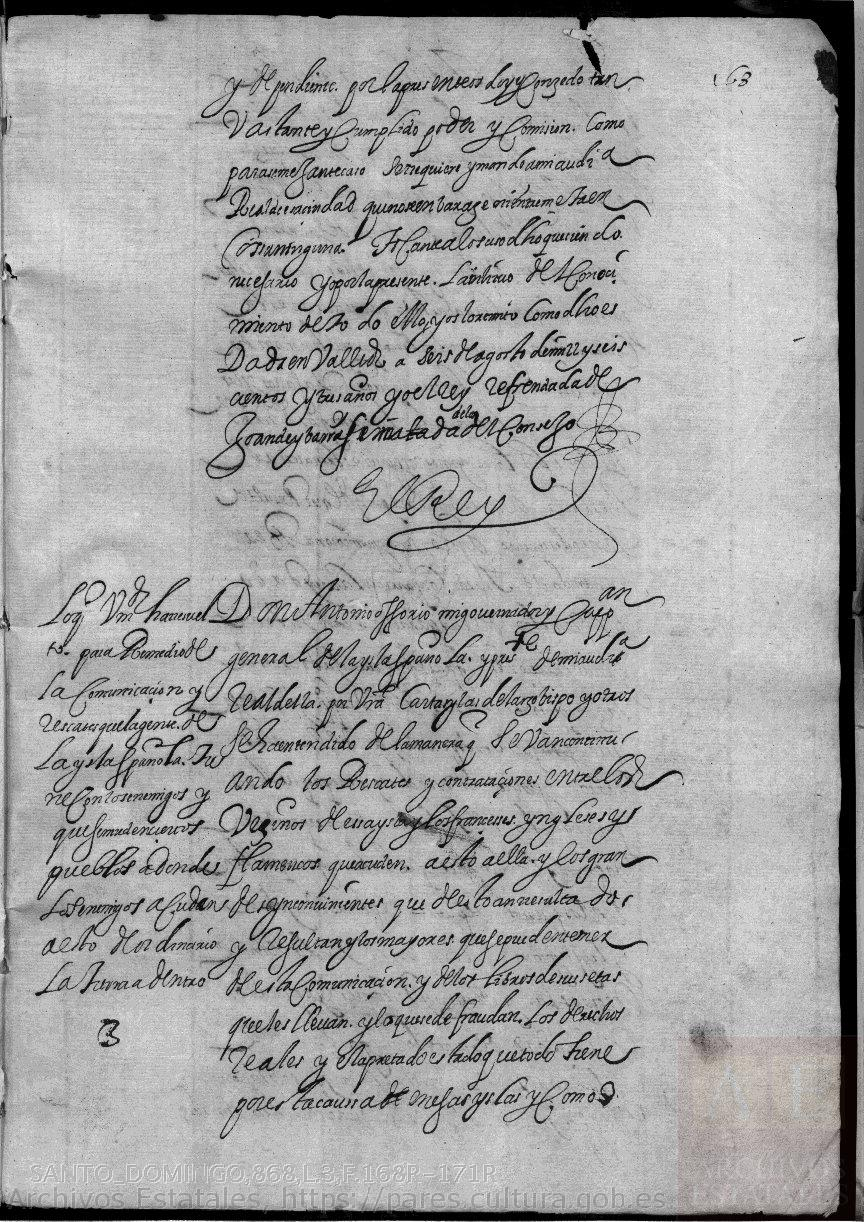

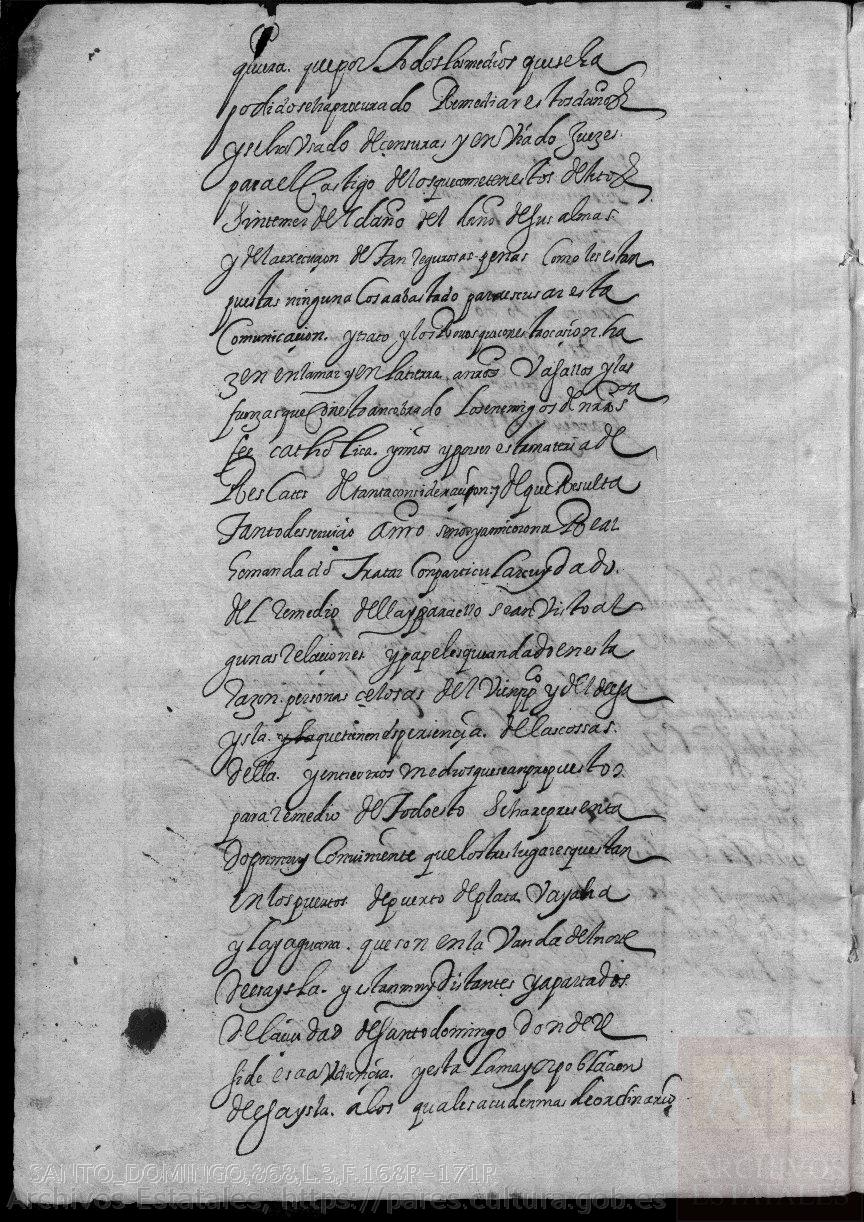

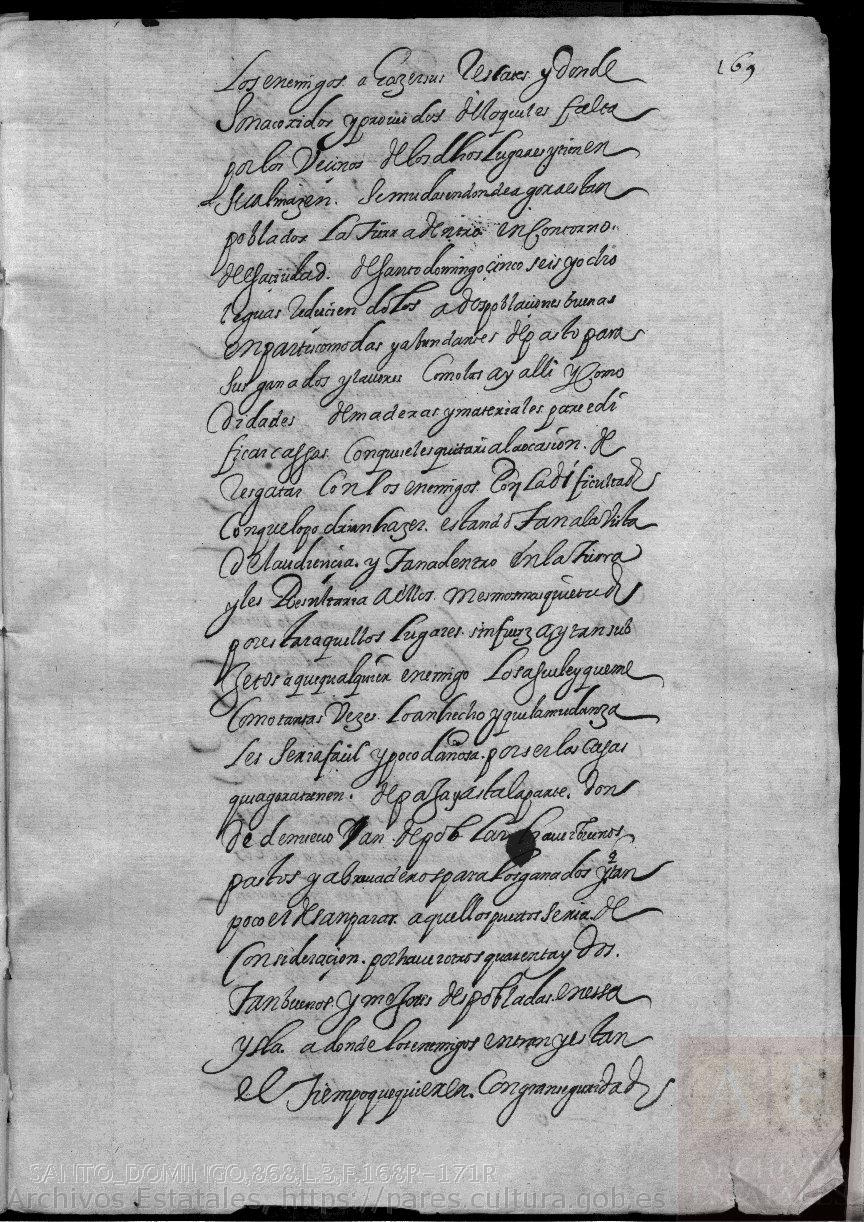

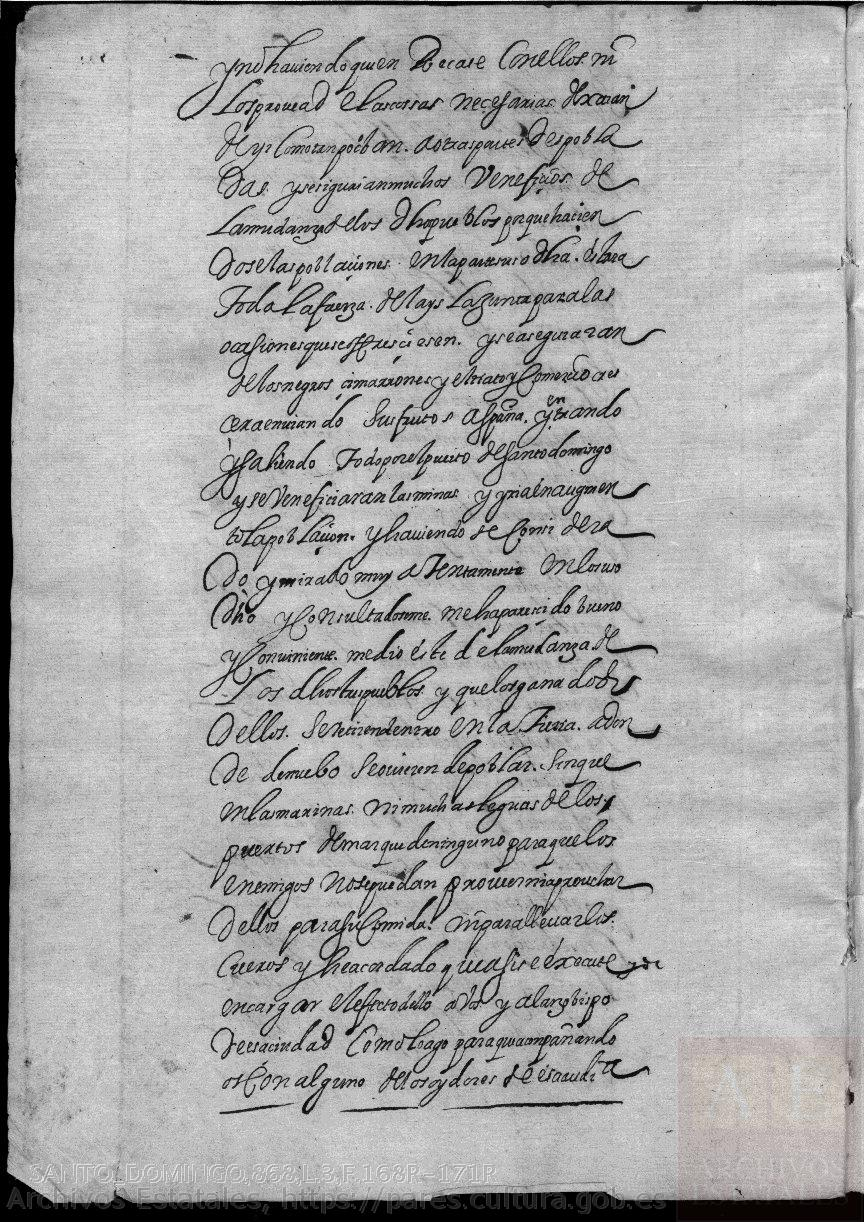

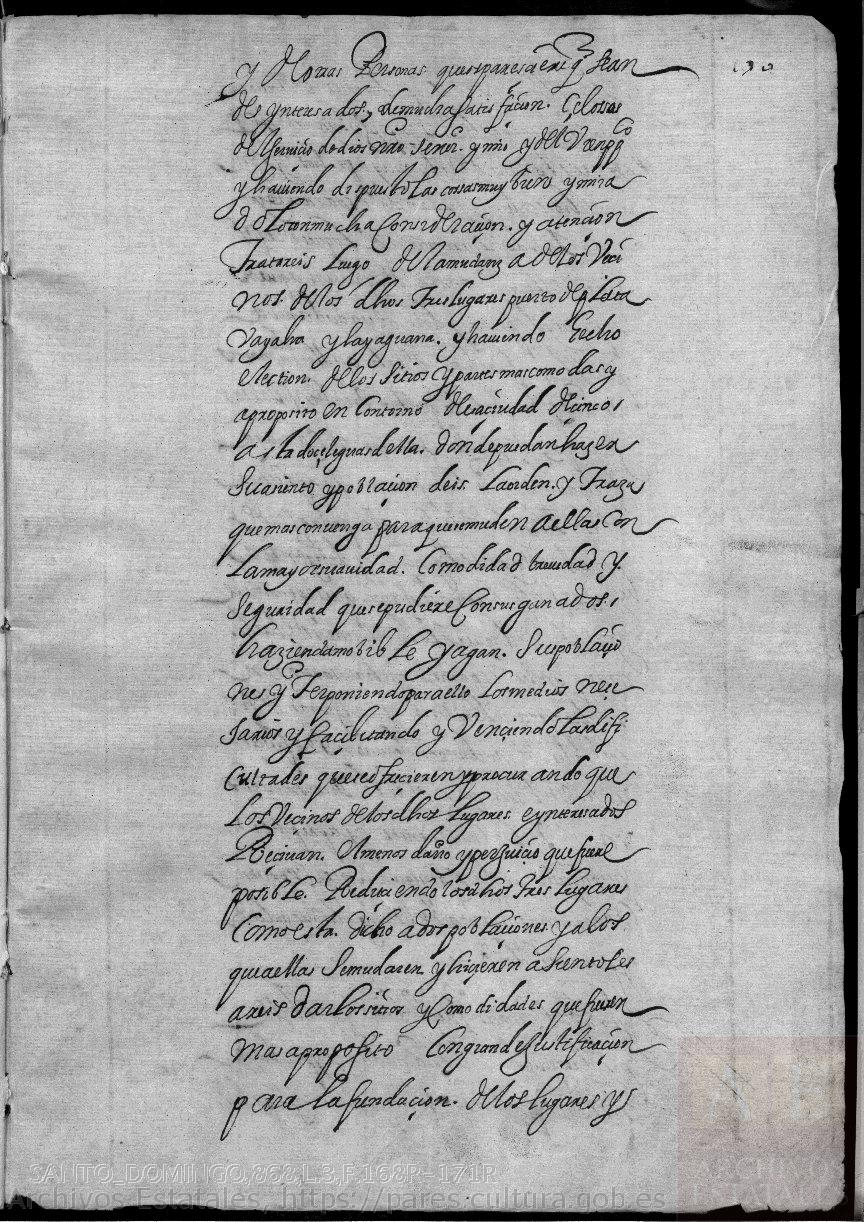

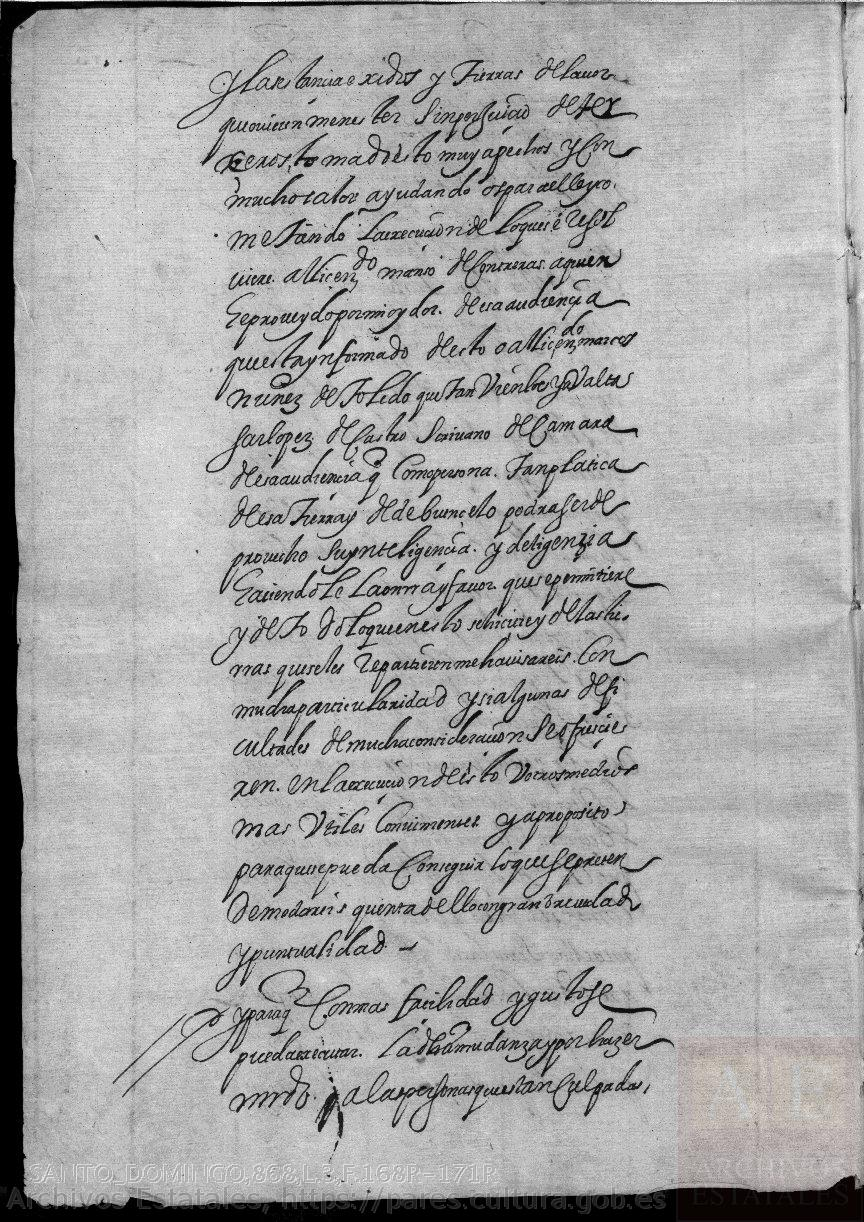

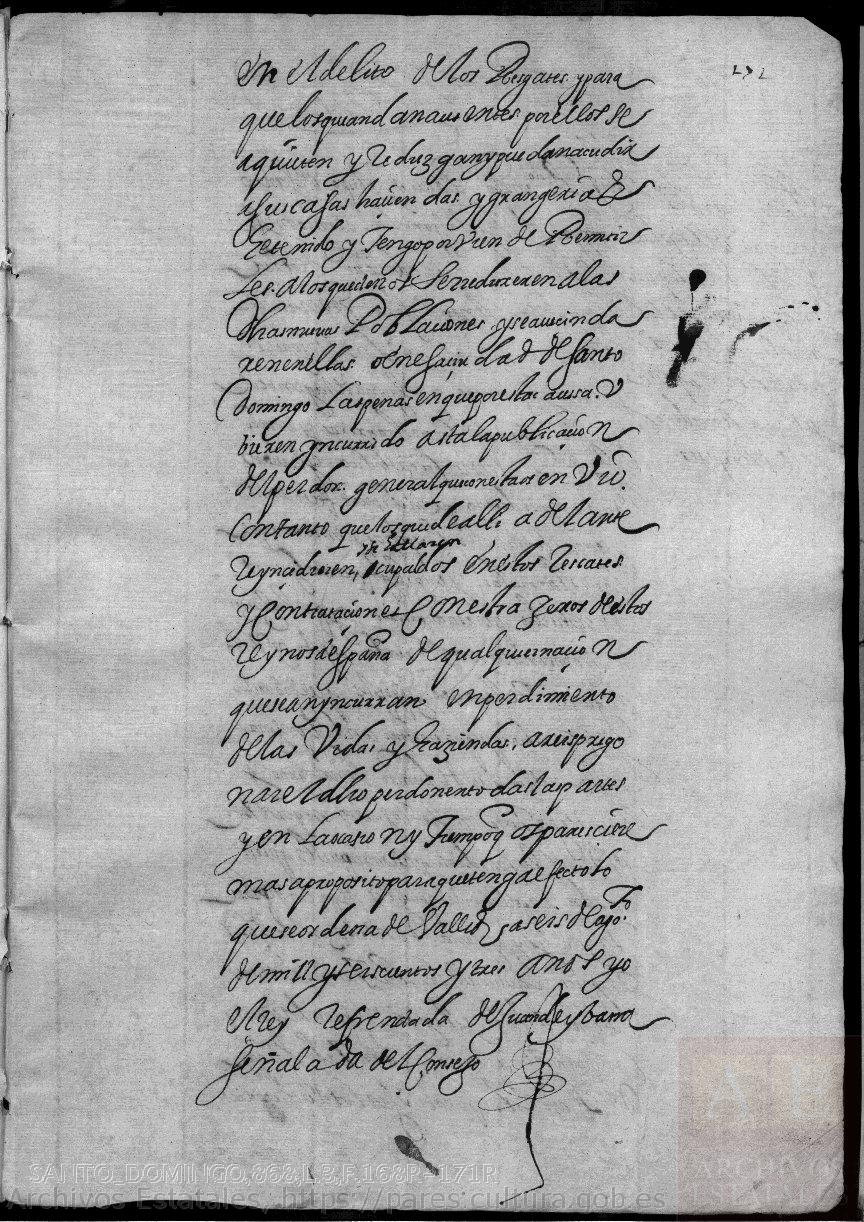

=== Dispatch from King Philip III to Archbishop Agustín Dávila y Padilla ===
The order to devastate the western part of the island was given to both Governor Antonio de Osorio and the Archbishop of Santo Domingo, Fray Agustín Dávila y Padilla, the highest religious authority on the island at the time.

Dávila y Padilla was also granted authority to participate in carrying out the Devastations because the Spanish Crown, under Philip III, considered smuggling with foreigners (mainly English and Dutch) not only an economic and political problem, but also a religious threat. The introduction of Protestant Reformation influences (including Lutheranism and Calvinism) through the sale of Lutheran Bibles and contact with "heretics" was feared. However, historical evidence of Protestant baptisms or the establishment of formal Protestant churches in the west of the island before 1605 is very limited or nonexistent; the risk was more a suspicion and fear on the part of the Spanish authorities to justify the measure. The archbishop's involvement focused more on the moral management of the relocation of Catholic subjects and on offering pardon to those who complied with the royal order.

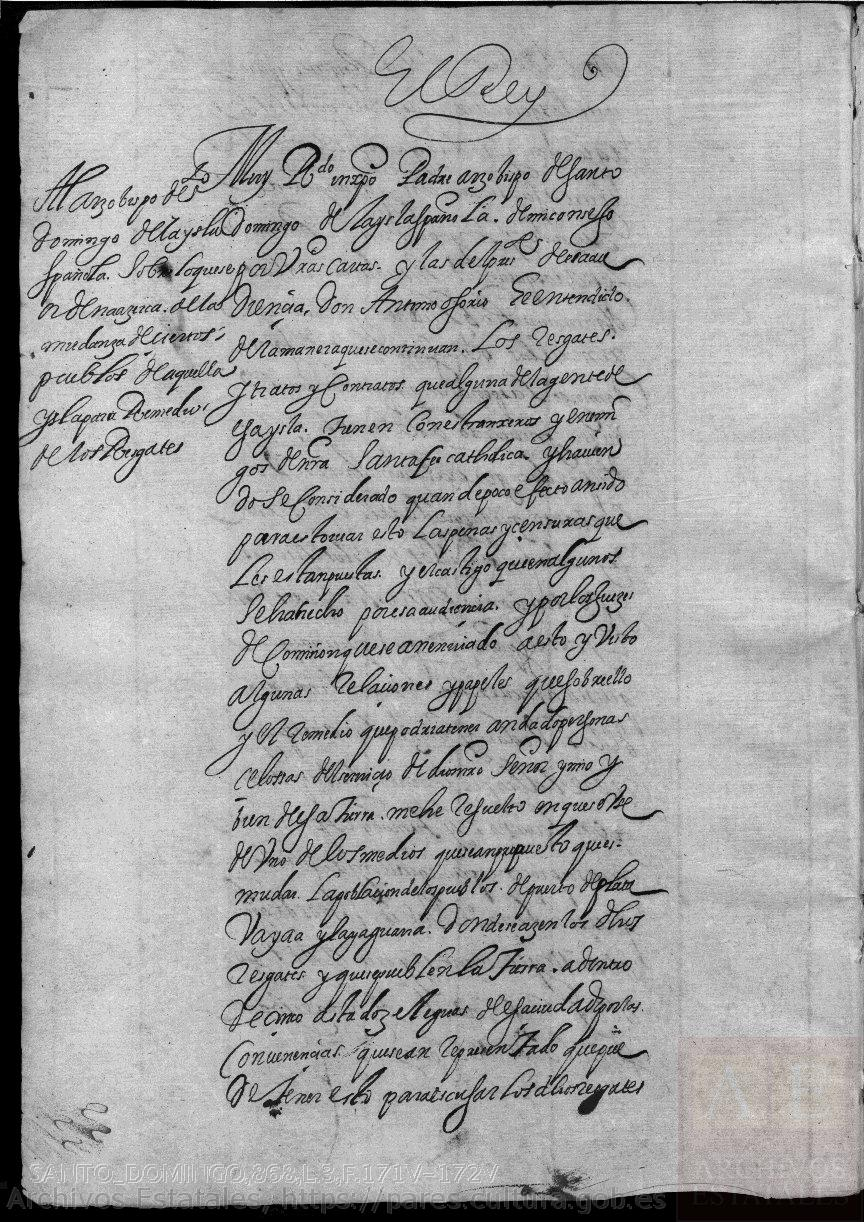
First page of the Royal order given to Agustin Davila y Padilla

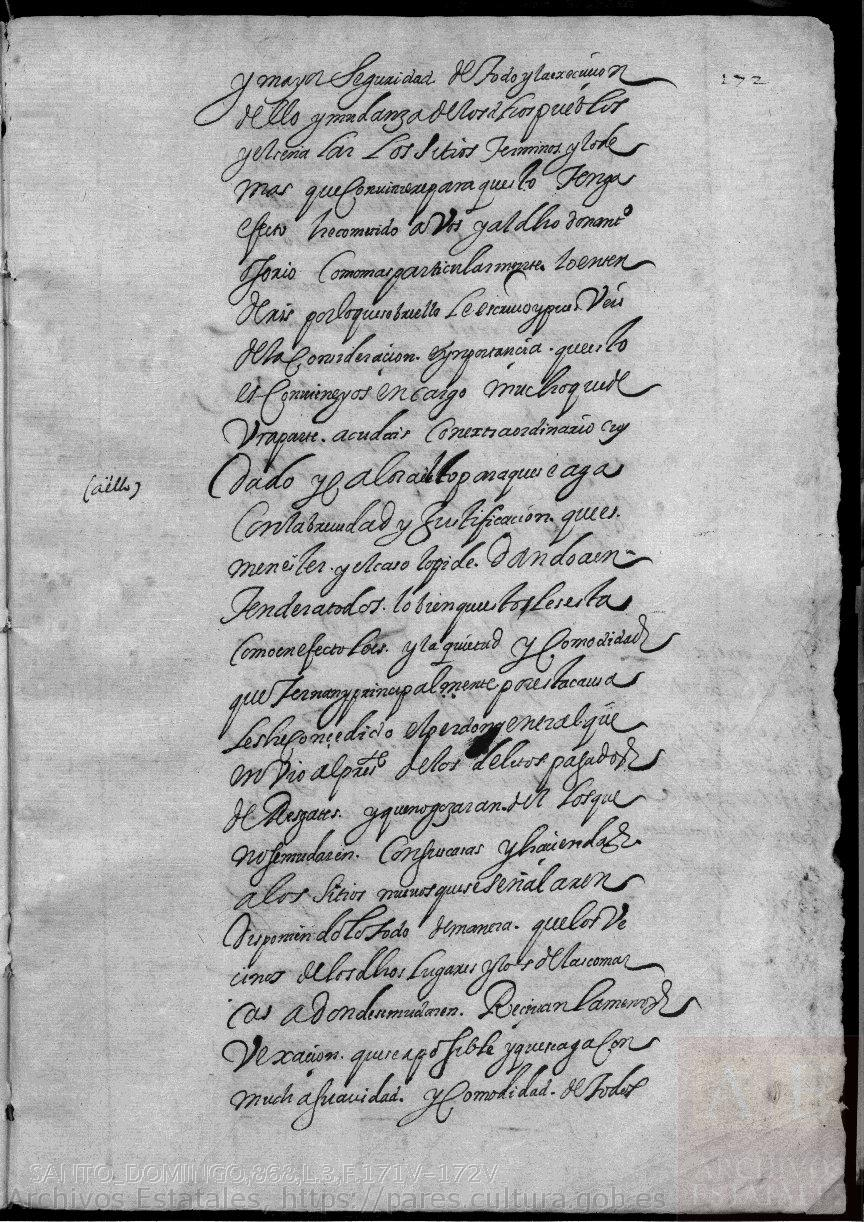
Second page of the order

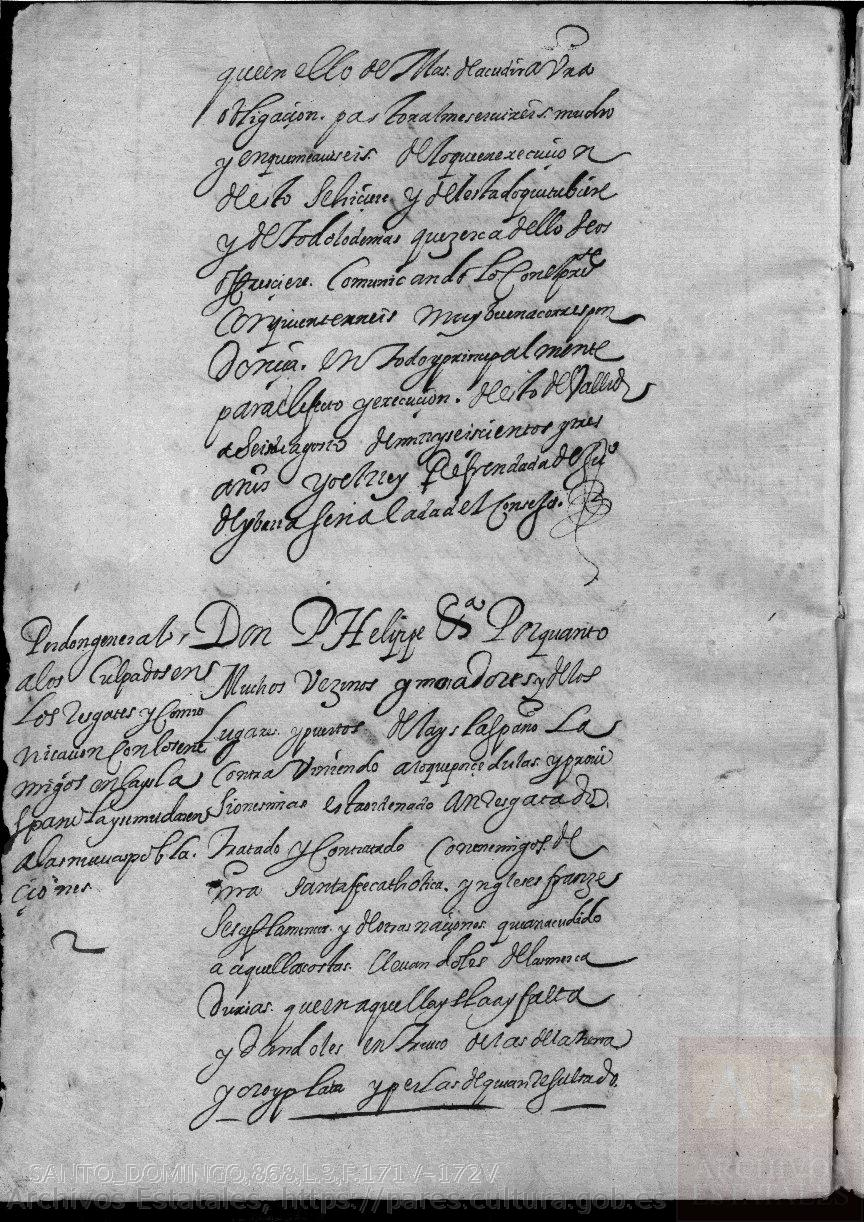
Third page of the order

== Antonio de Osorio's Trial of Residence ==
In the old Spanish legal system, the trial of residence (or simply residencia) was a mandatory evaluation to which all imperial officials had to submit upon completion of their term, in order to examine and judge their performance in office.

Antonio de Osorio's term as governor and captain general of Hispaniola ended on February 11, 1608, and he was replaced by Diego Gómez de Sandoval.

According to available information, the residencia had disastrous consequences for Osorio. The trial was plagued by lawsuits for damages filed against him by those who had lost their livestock, property, and possessions due to the devastation. It is believed that the pressures of the process severely affected his health.

Despite this adverse legal situation, King Philip III of Spain had granted Osorio, in 1607, permission to return to Spain and a pension of 2,000 ducats a year as a reward for his service.

Furthermore, the king ordered that his case be transferred to Spain for adjudication there. However, Osorio died at the age of 65 in the Atlantic Ocean in 1608, while sailing towards Spain, due to his poor health.

== The exception with Cuba and Puerto Rico and the ruin of Hispaniola ==
=== Why weren't devastations like Osorio's carried out in Cuba and Puerto Rico ===
The Coat of Arms of Havana represents the historical importance of Cuba's capital. The Spanish Crown designated Havana as the "Key to the New World" (Clavis Novi Mundi) because of its strategic location as a gathering point for Spanish fleets returning to Europe. The shield features a big golden key that confirms its symbolic and geographical role as the gateway to the continent and three silver castles representing the city's main fortresses: La Fuerza, El Morro, and La Punta.

Like the island of Hispaniola, Cuba and Puerto Rico were Spanish possessions where smuggling with foreign powers was a frequent practice. However, mass depopulations were not carried out on these islands due to the following reasons:

- Havana as Key of the New world: The city of Havana, in Cuba, was considered the Key to the New World. This was because its port served as the strategic assembly point for the Spanish treasure fleet that transported the riches of Mexico and Peru. Once grouped in Havana, the ships set sail together in a convoy toward Spain to protect themselves from attacks by pirates and privateers. In Cuba, there were no depopulations to combat smuggling because the city of Havana was not self-sufficient; it depended on the rest of the towns for supplies of meat, hides, and provisions for the sailors, residents, and merchants. Had devastations been carried out in Cuba as they were in Santo Domingo, the entire island would have been lost, as the economic base that sustained its strategic capital would have been destroyed.
- San Juan as a stronghold of the Caribbean: The City of San Juan, in Puerto Rico, was considered the bastion of the New World due to its strategic location at the 'gateway' to the Caribbean. As the first major island encountered by fleets arriving from Europe, it was heavily fortified to prevent rival powers from penetrating the Caribbean Sea. It served as the Spanish Empire's first line of defense, protecting routes to key territories such as Mexico, Panama, and Cartagena. Although there was smuggling in the rest of the island, the Crown preferred to tolerate it or attempt to control it minimally rather than destroy the towns, because losing the loyalty of the people in the interior meant leaving the island vulnerable to an English or French invasion that would jeopardize the entrance to the Caribbean.
- Havana and San Juan as an Appendix to St. Augustine: The city of St. Augustine, on the Florida peninsula (then a Spanish territory), was considered the sentinel of the strait. Its function was to protect the passage of ships departing from Havana, taking advantage of the Gulf Stream on their way to Europe. Its fortress and strategic position served to protect the coast and prevent enemies from intercepting ships departing loaded with gold and silver. Together with Havana and San Juan, it formed Spain's defensive triangle in the New World.

San Juan, Havana, and St. Augustine constituted the strategic circuit for the transport of Spain's precious metals in the Greater Caribbean. Vessels arriving from Europe typically entered the Caribbean Sea through San Juan, which served as the first line of defense and a technical port of call. Havana functioned as the logistical hub, where ships laden with the riches of Mexico and Peru regrouped to form the Spanish Treasure Fleet (the Flota de Indias). Finally, St. Augustine acted as a vital surveillance enclave to guard the galleons' passage through the Bahamas Channel. This was the most vulnerable moment of the voyage, as the ships sailed heavily laden with gold and silver on their return route, being protected there from piracy and enemy pursuit.

=== Conditions that condemned Hispaniola ===
- Economic decline of Santo Domingo:The Captaincy General of Santo Domingo, on the island of Hispaniola, was originally Spain's most important possession in the Americas. Santo Domingo served as the starting point for the conquest of the americas and the center where the political, economic, legal, and ecclesiastical institutions that were later replicated throughout the continent were established. The spanish conquistadors Juan Ponce de León (Puerto Rico and Florida), Diego Velázquez de Cuéllar (Cuba), Rodrigo de Bastidas (the Colombian coast), Alonso de Ojeda (Venezuela and Colombia), Juan de Esquivel (Jamaica), Vasco Núñez de Balboa (who sighted the Pacific Ocean), and Hernando de Soto (North America) lived on the island and organized their expeditions there. Even Hernán Cortés and Francisco Pizarro resided in Hispaniola long before undertaking the conquests of Mexico and Peru, respectively. However, as the Crown discovered more extensive and wealthier territories, the island was relegated to the background—a gradual loss of interest that was definitively cemented after the fall of the Aztec and Inca empires. Following the conquest of the Aztec and Inca empires, the Crown's interest shifted toward the gold and silver of Mexico and Peru. When Hispaniola’s alluvial gold deposits were exhausted, the island lost its central economic relevance for the Spanish Crown. This scarcity coincided with the conquest of Mexico and Peru, territories where massive deposits of silver (such as Zacatecas and Potosí) and gold (especially in New Granada) were discovered. These findings diverted the Crown’s attention and resources toward the mainland, plunging the island into precariousness. At the same time, an exodus of settlers occurred as they abandoned Hispaniola, lured by news of great riches in the newly discovered territories; only those who, due to extreme poverty, could not afford the journey, or those whose commitments and obligations forced them to stay, remained on the island.
- Economic problems of the Spanish Crown Spain established and maintained its American territories under constant economic problems. The Empire was in permanent warfare in Europe against Germany, England, and Flanders, which forced it to secure funds to pay for its troops and ships. Once the alluvial gold in Hispaniola was exhausted, Spain focused its resources on Mexico and South America to extract the wealth it needed, relegating the island to the background. Nevertheless, Florida, Cuba, and Puerto Rico, although they produced no precious metals, constituted the defensive circuit through which the continent's wealth departed for Spain, which is why they could not be abandoned.
- Location of cities and adverse geography: The Caribbean's smuggling hot zone was primarily located along the northern and western coasts of Cuba, Hispaniola, and Puerto Rico. While Cuba and Puerto Rico had their capitals on the northern coast, facilitating some degree of surveillance, the capital of Hispaniola, Santo Domingo, was located on the southern coast. This physical distance, combined with a terrain much more rugged and mountainous than that of its neighboring islands, made it difficult for royal authorities to travel to the northwest to combat illegal trade. Smugglers deliberately sought out these remote areas, far from royal auditors, to operate with impunity.

== Similarity to Florida expedition ==
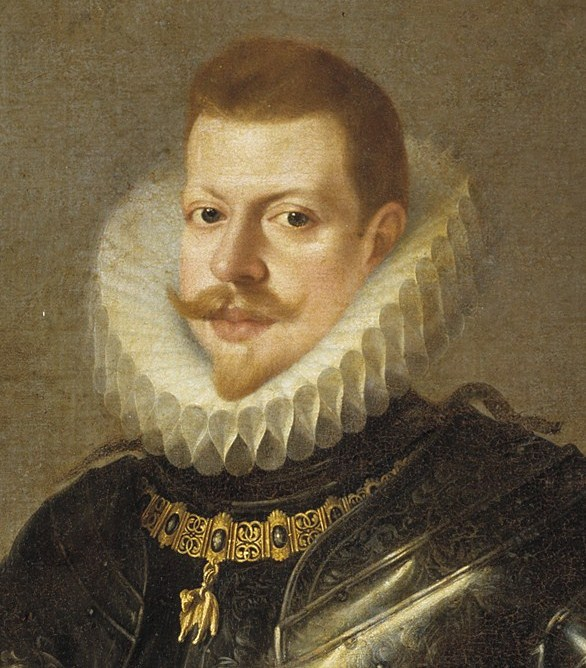
Philip III, the Spanish king who ordered the devastations. Ancient and modern historians agree that Philip III lacked the necessary qualifications to govern. An example of this was his decision to place the administration of his government in the hands of his favorites, rather than assuming it himself. Many historians attribute the decline of the Spanish Empire to the economic difficulties that began early in his reign.

A similar situation occurred in Spanish Florida. In the middle of 1601, Philip III, observing the difficulties in maintaining the sparse population of Spanish settlers in the face of continued attacks by the native Indians (and also noticing the limited amount of agricultural and livestock production), ordered the governor of Havana, Juan Maldonado Barnuevo, to send an expedition northwards. The expedition, composed of soldiers and friars under the command of Captain Don Fernando de Valdés, was to perform an inspection and determine the cost to the Crown of maintaining the province. Although the expedition found places in Florida that could have been better utilized for colonial establishments, the Captain warned that the abandonment of San Agustín could harm Spain to the benefit of her enemies. Finally, the combined efforts of Fernando de Valdés and other officials such as Alonso de las Alas, Bartolomé de Argüelles, Juan Menéndez Marques and the friars who accompanied the expedition (who believed that the Indians of Florida provided bountiful opportunities for conversion to Christianity) proved to be successful in averting the abandonment of Florida.

The Osorio Devastations signified the beginning of the strengthening of the Spanish military presence in Hispaniola, since, to put the order into practice, the support of 159 soldiers from the garrison of San Juan Bautista was requested from Puerto Rico. The terrible economic impact of the royal order eventually caused a change in the financing of Hispaniola, transferring it from the viceroyalty of New Spain to that of viceroyalty of Peru. However, from the 1680s onwards, the growing threat of buccaneers as well as that of French forces meant that Hispaniola and Cuba became major recipients of economic resources from New Spain, primarily for military purposes.

Historians conclude that the Devastations of Osorio constituted an error that brought no benefits to the colonists nor to the Spanish Crown. Instead, it left the economy of the island in a state of crisis and stagnation that lasted several decades. In addition, it presented an opportunity for foreigners and enemies of Spain to settle the abandoned territory, who later formed the French colony of Saint-Domingue. From the 18th century, thanks to its productive sugar and coffee plantations, it became one of the strongest economies of the Caribbean and the principal colony of France.

== In fiction ==
- The Devastations form the backdrop of Antonio Benitez-Rojo's short story "Windward Passage" in the collection A View from the Mangrove
- The Spanish-Dominican writer Carlos Esteban Deive published a novel in 1979, Las devastaciones, which won the Premio Siboney

== See also ==

The Spanish Archives Portal (PARES) of the Ministry of Culture of Spain holds several historical documents related to the Devastations of Osorio.
Access search results in PARES

- Treaty of Tordesillas
- Atlantic Slave trade
- Treaty of Ryswick of 1697
- Treaty of Aranjuez of 1777
- Treaty of Basel of 1795
- Age of France in Spanish Santo Domingo
- Spanish reconquest of Santo Domingo
- Constitution of Cadiz of 1812 (Article 8)
- Treaty of Paris of 1814
- Ordinance of Charles X of 1825
- Treaty of Recognition, Peace, Friendship, Commerce, and Navigation (1848)

== Notes ==
Chronology of Hispaniola
Previous	Current	Next
The Santo Domingo; Smuggling Crisis	The Osorio; Devastations	French Occupation of the West of the Island

== Licence ==
This article incorporates text by Rafal Reichert available under the CC BY-SA 4.0 license.
