= Church of La Victoria, Alcalá de los Gazules =

Roman Catholic church in Andalusia, Spain

The Church of La Victoria or the Church of the Convent of San Francisco de Paula is a provincial Baroque-style, Roman Catholic church located on the street: Alameda de la Cruz of the town of Alcalá de los Gazules, province of Cádiz, autonomous community of Andalusia, Spain.

== History ==
The church was erected in the 17th century, with construction completed in 1682. Like many Franciscan churches in Andalusia, it was dedicated to the Marian devotion of Santa Maria de la Victoria, or Holy Mary of the Victory, in gratitude and commemoration to the donation of the Ermita de Santa María de la Victoria de Malaga to the order of Minims by Ferdinand and Isabel, the conquerors of the Nasrid kingdom of Granada.

The church has a single nave with a dome at the crossing. The dome has a frescoed floral design inscribed in the center with the Franciscan motto of Charity. The nave walls have pilasters with Corinthian capitals.

The main altar (1797) was sculpted in wood by Sebastián de Aguilar y Castaneda. The central icon of the Virgin of the Victory can be moved to display a gilded sun symbol. The icon is flanked by San Miguel and San Idelfonso.

The chapel of the Sagratio has a wooden statue of Jesus Nazarene by José Montes de Oca (1668–1748). The image is used in holy week processions.

Next to this chapel is a small image of the Virgen de los Santos, Patron of the town of Alcalá de los Gazules.
