= Agustín Dávila Padilla =

Mexican Dominican, writer and Archbishop

Agustín Dávila Padilla (1562 in Mexico City – 1604) was a Mexican Dominican, a writer and Archbishop of Santo Domingo.

== Works ==
Dávila Padilla was not the author of numerous works, but his Historia de la Fundación y Discurso de la Provincia de Santiago de México de la Orden de Predicadores por las vidas de sus varones insignes y casos notables de Nueva España (Madrid, 1596; Brussels, 1625) is an important history of the Dominicans in Mexico from 1526 until 1592. As was typical of such a work, Dávila Padilla emphasized the virtues of fellow Dominicans, as well as their work among the indigenous. He deals with the founder of the Mexican province, Fray Domingo de Betanzos and Fray Bartolomé de Las Casas, among others. His work is an important source of early colonial Mesoamerican ethnohistory. Beristain mentions a third edition of 1634. While not free from mistakes, it was a major chronicle of the Dominican Order and its missions in America up to the end of the sixteenth century.

== External links and additional sources ==
- Cheney, David M. "Archdiocese of Santo Domingo". Catholic-Hierarchy.org. (for Chronology of Bishops) ^{[self-published]}
- Chow, Gabriel. "Metropolitan Archdiocese of Santo Domingo". GCatholic.org. (for Chronology of Bishops) ^{[self-published]}

Religious titles
Preceded by Nicolás de Ramos y Santos	Archbishop of Santo Domingo; 1599–1604	Succeeded by Domingo Valderrama y Centeno
