= List of churches in the Diocese of Fajardo–Humacao =

This is a list of current and former Roman Catholic churches in the Diocese of Fajardo–Humacao, one of the suffragan dioceses of the Archdiocese of San Juan de Puerto Rico. The jurisdiction of this diocese comprises the Puerto Rican municipalities of Canóvanas, Ceiba, Culebra, Fajardo, Humacao, Loíza, Luquillo, Naguabo, Río Grande and Vieques.

The mother church of the diocese is the Fajardo Cathedral, dedicated to Saint James the Apostle.

== Municipality of Canóvanas ==
Church name	Image	Location	Date est.	Description/notes
Nuestra Señora de la Asunción		Hato Puerco		
Nuestra Señora del Carmen		Hato Puerco		
Nuestra Señora del Pilar		Canóvanas Pueblo	1960	Main town parish of Canóvanas, located on the Plaza Profesor Juan Francisco Arroyo Salamán. Although a town hermitage existed at the site since the 19th century, the parish was not canonically established until 1960.
Resurrección del Señor		Canóvanas		
Sagrado Corazón de Jesús		Cubuy		
San José		Hato Puerco		
San Pedro		Lomas		
Santa María, Madre de Dios		Canóvanas		
Santa María de La Central		Torrecilla Alta		

== Municipality of Ceiba ==
Church name	Image	Location	Date est.	Description/notes
San Antonio de Padua		Ceiba Pueblo	1840	Main town parish of Ceiba, located on its main town square, Plaza Felisa Rincón de Gautier. The current church structure dates to 1932.

== Municipality of Culebra ==
Church name	Image	Location	Date est.	Description/notes
Nuestra Señora del Carmen		Culebra Pueblo (Dewey)	1889	Main town parish of Culebra, located in the main settlement of the island municipality. The current church building dates to the 20th century.

== Municipality of Fajardo ==
Church name	Image	Location	Date est.	Description/notes
Nuestra Señora de la Providencia		Quebrada Fajardo		
Nuestra Señora de Lourdes		Sardinera		Community church of Las Croabas.
Nuestra Señora del Carmen		Sardinera		
Nuestra Señora del Perpetuo Socorro		Quebrada Vueltas		
San Juan Bautista		Sardinera		
Santa Elena		Florencio		
Santiago Apóstol		Fajardo Pueblo	1776	Cathedral and main town church of Fajardo, located on the Plaza Antonio Rafael Barceló. The former parish was elevated to co-cathedral status by Pope Benedict XVI in 2008.
Santísimo Redentor		Quebrada Fajardo		

== Municipality of Humacao ==
Church name	Image	Location	Date est.	Description/notes
Buen Pastor		Mariana		
Dulce Nombre de Jesús		Humacao Pueblo	1769	Cathedral and main town church of Humacao, located on the Plaza Luis Muñoz Rivera. Different iterations of the church have been built in 1826 and then 1877 (the current one). The former parish was elevated to co-cathedral status by Pope Benedict XVI in 2008.
Inmaculada Concepción		Río Abajo		
María Reina de la Paz		Tejas		
Nuestra Señora de Fátima		Río Abajo		
Nuestra Señora de la Candelaria		Candelero Arriba		
Nuestra Señora del Carmen		Punta Santiago	1890	First established canonically as a chapel at the site of a former rural hermitage to serve the growing community of Humacao Playa (today Punta Santiago). The current parish church building dates to 1980.
Sagrada Familia		Candelero Abajo		Community church of Palmas del Mar.
San Agustín		Antón Ruíz		
San José		Mabú		
San Martín de Porres		Tejas		
San Pedro y San Pablo		Mabú		
Santa Rosa de Lima		Mariana		

== Municipality of Loíza ==
Church name	Image	Location	Date est.	Description/notes
Espíritu Santo y San Patricio		Loíza Pueblo	1645	Main town parish of Loíza, located on the main town square. One of the oldest established parish churches in the island, the current church building dates to 1729. The parish today is notable for its annual devotion to Saint Patrick and strong Afro-Puerto Rican folklore.
Santa Rosa de Lima		Torrecilla Baja		Community church of Piñones.
Santiago Apóstol		Medianía Alta		

== Municipality of Luquillo ==
Church name	Image	Location	Date est.	Description/notes
Perpetuo Socorro		Juan Martín		
San José		Luquillo Pueblo	1834	Main town church of Luquillo, located across from the Plaza Rosendo Matienzo Cintrón. A hermitage existed previously at the site as early as 1797. The currently existing church building was built between 1930 and 1932 after the original church was damaged by various hurricanes.
Santiago Apóstol		Pitahaya		Diocesan sanctuary dedicated to Saint James the Apostle, patron of the diocese.

== Municipality of Naguabo ==
Church name	Image	Location	Date est.	Description/notes
Beato Carlos Manuel Rodríguez		Río		
Nuestra Señora de Fátima		Daguao		
Nuestra Señora de Fátima		Duque		
Nuestra Señora de la Altagracia		Maizales		
Nuestra Señora del Carmen		Húcares		
Nuestra Señora del Perpetuo Socorro		Río Blanco		
Nuestra Señora del Rosario		Naguabo Pueblo	1856	Main town parish of Naguabo, located on the Plaza Luis Muñoz Rivera.
Santa Rosa de Lima		Santiago y Lima		
Virgen de la Medalla Milagrosa		Río Blanco		

== Municipality of Río Grande ==
Church name	Image	Location	Date est.	Description/notes
Cristo Rey		Mameyes II	1970	Community church of poblado Palmer.
Nuestra Señora de la Guadalupe		Ciénaga Baja		
Nuestra Señora del Carmen		Guzmán Abajo		
Nuestra Señora del Carmen		Río Grande Pueblo	1840	Main town parish of Río Grande, located in the main town square. The current church building was erected sometime in the 20th century.

== Municipality of Vieques ==
Church name	Image	Location	Date est.	Description/notes
Nuestra Señora de Lourdes		Puerto Real		Community church of poblado Esperanza.
Nuestra Señora del Perpetuo Socorro		Florida		
Santiago Apóstol e Inmaculada Concepción		Isabel Segunda	1844	Main town church of Isabel Segunda (the main settlement of Vieques), located across from the Plaza Luis Muñoz Rivera. The current church building was erected in the 20th century.
