= Catholic Church in Puerto Rico =

Part of the worldwide Catholic Church in communion with the Pope in Rome

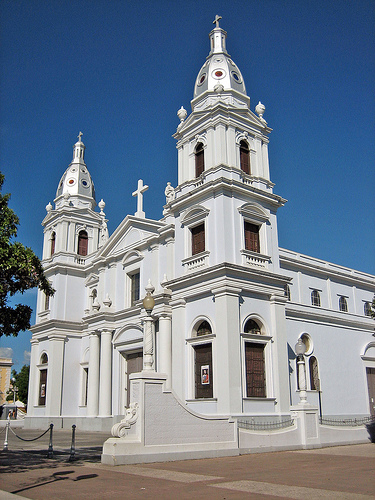
The Cathedral of Our Lady of Guadalupe in Ponce, seat of the Diocese of Ponce.

The Catholic Church in Puerto Rico is part of the worldwide Catholic Church in communion with the pope in Rome. The 78 municipalities in Puerto Rico have a Catholic church which is located in the downtown area, normally across from the central plaza.

== History ==
In Puerto Rico, the founding of a town (or municipio) very much depended on the building of a church, a town hall, a butcher's shop and a cemetery. The citizens of the town constructed and decorated the church. As was customary in Spain, in Puerto Rico, the municipality has a barrio called pueblo until it was called barrio-pueblo in 1990 by the US census. The barrio-pueblo of a municipio contains a central plaza, the municipal buildings (city hall), and a Catholic church.

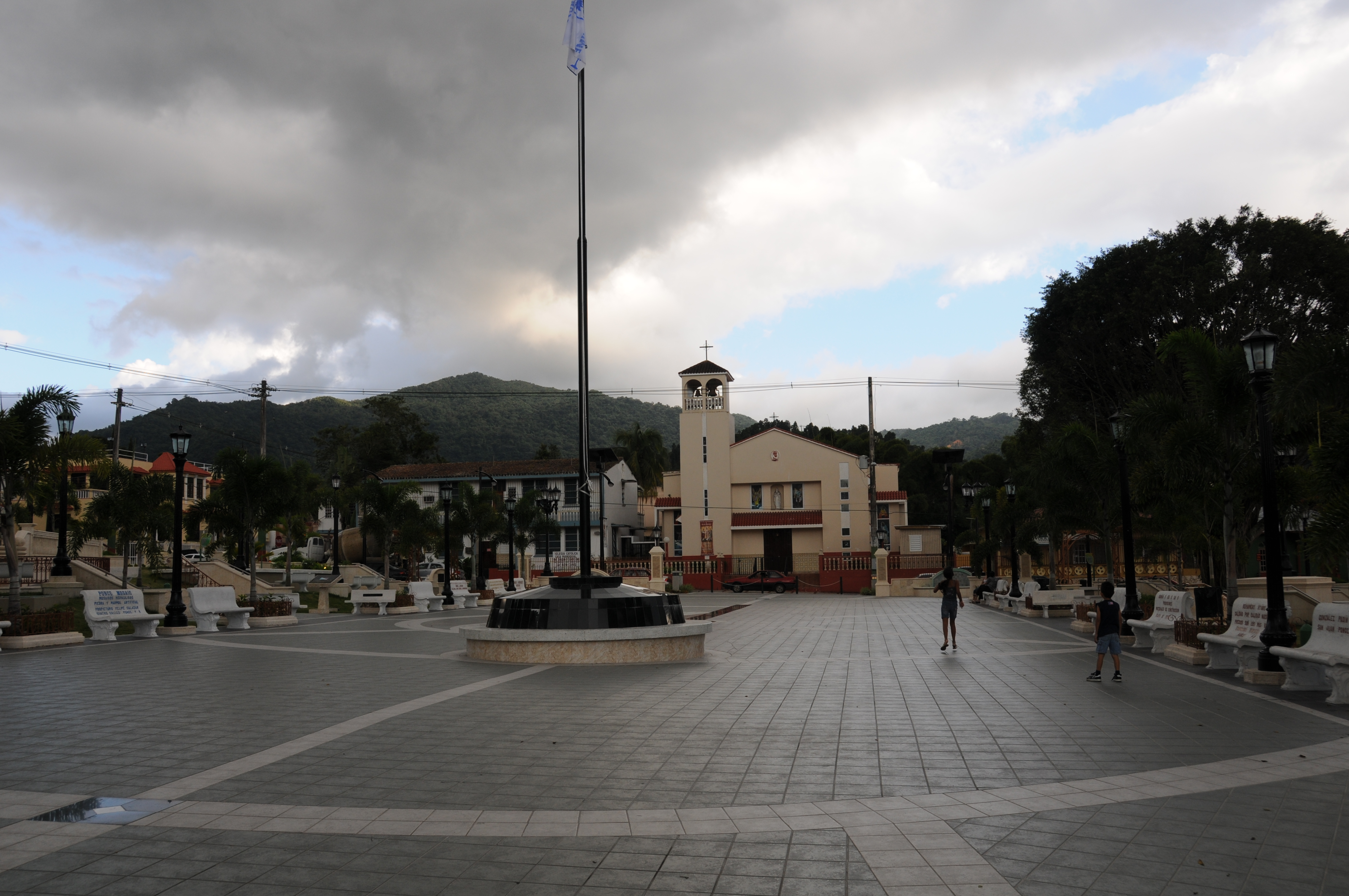
The Adjuntas barrio-pueblo plaza with its Catholic church, seen in the background, is where the Adjuntas' annual patron saint festival is held.

It is near the church, which fronts the town's plaza, that fiestas patronales (patron saint festivals) are held in every year. The Laws of the Indies, Spanish law, which regulated life in Puerto Rico in the early 19th century, stated the plaza's purpose was for "the parties" (celebrations, festivities) (Spanish: a propósito para las fiestas), and that the square was to be proportionally large enough for the number of neighbors (Spanish: grandeza proporcionada al número de vecinos). These Spanish regulations also stated that the streets nearby should be comfortable portals for passersby, protecting them from the elements: sun and rain. The church buildings themselves have been restored many times over the years and are an important part of Puerto Rico's architectural history.

During Puerto Rico's transition from Spanish rule to United States rule in the late 19th century and early 20th century, the Roman Catholic Church laid claim to many properties located in Puerto Rico. An agreement was reached and a payment of $180,000 was made in three equal installments to the Catholic Church for the properties. Juan Perpiña y Pibernat was the priest who presided over the church in Puerto Rico during that time of transition. Henry K. Carroll, Special Commissioner for the United States, studied the situation in Puerto Rico and reported back that up until then, black clerics (Spanish: cléricos negros) had been prohibited by Spain. Further analysis by Samuel Silva Gotay says that the church had chosen to ally with the hacienda owners more than with the common people before, during and after slavery had been abolished.

== Present situation ==
Religious breakdown in Puerto Rico (2010)
1. Catholic (69.7%)
2. Protestant (25.1%)
3. Other Christian (1.90%)
4. Other (1.40%)
5. Irreligious (1.90%)

The CIA World Factbook reports that 85% of the population of Puerto Rico is Catholic, with the remaining 15% divided among Protestantism, Islam, and Judaism. However, the CIA report provides no date or source for the data; it may be outdated. Some sources, including Pew Research Center, put the Catholic percentage at approximately 70%. An Associated Press article in March 2014 stated that "more than 70 percent of whom identify themselves as Catholic" but provided no source for this information (they may have used the 2010 Pew Research data).

However, in a November 2014 report, with the sub-title Widespread Change in a Historically Catholic Region, Pew Research indicated that only 56% of Puerto Ricans were Catholic and that 33% were Protestant; this survey was completed between October 2013 and February 2014.

When discussing Catholicism in Puerto Rico, Archbishop Roberto Gonzalez Nieves of San Juan offered this comment in 2007. "Its deepest roots are Latino ... U.S. rule began in 1898, at the end of the Spanish–American War, but indigenous, African and Spanish cultures "shaped its identity for 400 years" and that influence "cannot be undone overnight”. The shift from Spanish to U.S. rule brought a wave of anti-Catholic sentiment that led to the prohibition of the processions that are a mainstay of Latin American religious practice, as well as government policies that prohibited schools from teaching in Spanish. Since the approval of the Puerto Rican Constitution in 1952, popular religious traditions such as processions and festivals honoring communities' patron saints have taken root again.

In April 2025, Governor Jenniffer González-Colón signs legislation, Law No. 14-2025, "The Fundamental Right to Religious Freedom in Puerto Rico Act," "recognizes the fundamental right to religious freedom of organizations and individuals, and is protected by the United States Constitution, the Constitution of Puerto Rico, and the Universal Declaration of Human Rights. This law can be used in judicial and administrative cases and will allow the party claiming religious freedom to obtain payment of costs and attorneys' fees from the government if it is successful in its case".

There is also a Byzantine Catholic community of the St. Spyridon Parish in Trujillo Alto under the jurisdiction of Archbishop Roberto González Nieves.

== List of dioceses ==
- Archdiocese of San Juan de Puerto Rico
- Diocese of Arecibo
- Diocese of Caguas
- Diocese of Mayagüez
- Diocese of Ponce
- Diocese of Fajardo-Humacao – erected March 2008

== Individual churches ==
=== Municipality parishes ===
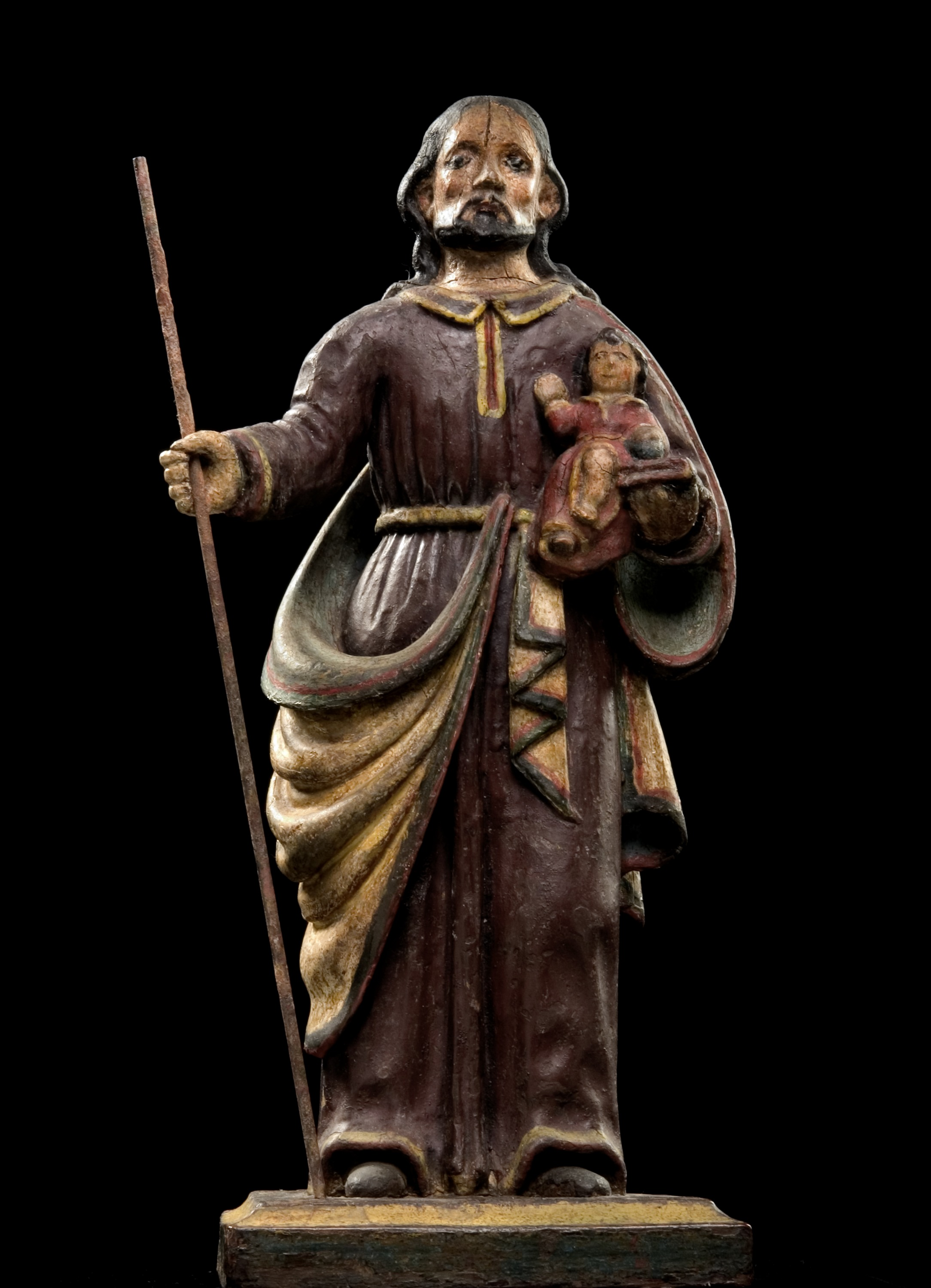
"San Jose y el Niño", ca. 1845 is a Santo statuette carved by Tiburcio de la Espada, born in San Germán, Puerto Rico. Saint Joseph is the patron saint of Ciales, Gurabo, Luquillo, Peñuelas, and Lares.

The following are the names of the 78 municipality Catholic parish churches in Puerto Rico:

- Adjuntas – Parroquia San Joaquín
- Aguada – Parroquia San Francisco de Asís
- Aguadilla – Parroquia San Carlos Borromeo
- Aguas Buenas – Parroquia Los Tres Santos Reyes
- Aibonito – Parroquia San José
- Añasco – Parroquia San Antonio Abad
- Arecibo – Catedral San Felipe Apostol
- Arroyo – Parroquia Nuestra Señora del Carmen
- Barceloneta – Parroquia Nuestra Señora del Carmen
- Barranquitas – Parroquia San Antonio de Padua
- Bayamón – Parroquia Invención de la Cruz
- Cabo Rojo – Parroquia San Miguel Arcángel
- Caguas – Catedral Dulce Nombre de Jesús
- Camuy – Parroquia San José
- Canóvanas – Parroquia Nuestra Señora del Pilar
- Carolina – Parroquia San Fernando
- Cataño – Parroquia Nuestra Señora del Carmen
- Cayey – Parroquia Nuestra Señora de la Asunción
- Ceiba – Parroquia San Antonio de Padua
- Ciales – Parroquia Nuestra Señora del Rosario
- Cidra – Parroquia Nuestra Señora del Carmen
- Coamo – Parroquia San Blas de Illescas
- Comerío – Parroquia Santo Cristo de la Salud
- Corozal – Parroquia La Sagrada Familia
- Culebra – Parroquia Nuestra Señora del Carmen
- Dorado – Parroquia San Antonio de Padua
- Fajardo – Concatedral Santiago Apóstol
- Florida – Parroquia Nuestra Señora de la Merced
- Guánica – Parroquia San Antonio Abad
- Guayama – Parroquia San Antonio de Padua
- Guayanilla – Parroquia Inmaculada Concepción
- Guaynabo – Parroquia San Pedro Mártir
- Gurabo – Parroquia San José
- Hatillo – Parroquia Nuestra Señora del Carmen
- Hormiqueros – Basílica Menor Nuestra Señora de la Monserrate
- Humacao – Concatedral Dulce Nombre de Jesús
- Isabela – Parroquia San Antonio de Padua
- Jayuya – Parroquia Nuestra Señora de la Monserrate
- Juana Díaz – Parroquia San Ramón Nonato
- Juncos – Parroquia Inmaculada Concepción
- Lajas – Parroquia Nuestra Señora de la Candelaria
- Lares – Parroquia San José
- Las Marías – Parroquia Inmaculado Corazón de María
- Las Piedras – Parroquia Inmaculada Concepción
- Loíza – Parroquia Espíritu Santo y San Patricio
- Luquillo – Parroquia San José
- Manatí – Parroquia Nuestra Señora de la Candelaria y San Matías Apostol
- Maricao – Parroquia San Juan Bautista
- Maunabo – Parroquia San Isidro Labrador
- Mayagüez – Catedral Nuestra Señora de la Candelaria
- Moca – Parroquia Nuestra Señora de la Monserrate
- Morovis – Parroquia Nuestra Señora del Carmen
- Naguabo – Parroquia Nuestra Señora del Rosario
- Naranjito – Parroquia San Miguel Arcángel
- Orocovis – Parroquia San Juan Bautista
- Patillas – Parroquia Inmaculado Corazón de María
- Peñuelas – Parroquia San José
- Ponce – Catedral Nuestra Señora de la Guadalupe
- Quebradillas – Parroquia San Rafael Arcángel
- Rincón – Parroquia Santa Rosa de Lima
- Río Grande – Parroquia Nuestra Señora del Carmen
- Sabana Grande – Parroquia San Isidro Labrador y Santa María de la Cabeza
- Salinas – Parroquia Nuestra Señora de la Monserrate
- San Germán – Parroquia San Germán de Auxerre
- San Juan – Catedral de San Juan Bautista
  - Catedral Metropolitana Basílica de San Juan Bautista (San Juan, Puerto Rico), San Juan
- San Lorenzo – Parroquia Nuestra Señora de las Mercedes
- San Sebastián – Parroquia San Sebastián Mártir
- Santa Isabel – Parroquia Santiago Apostol
- Toa Alta – Parroquia San Fernando Rey
- Toa Baja – Parroquia San Pedro Apostol
- Trujillo Alto – Parroquia Exaltación de la Santa Cruz
- Utuado – Parroquia San Miguel
- Vega Alta – Parroquia Inmaculada Concepción
- Vega Baja – Parroquia Nuestra Señora del Rosario
- Vieques – Parroquia Inmaculada Concepción
- Villalba – Parroquia Nuestra Señora del Carmen
- Yabucoa – Parroquia Santos Ángeles Custodios
- Yauco – Parroquia Santísimo Rosario

=== Other churches ===
- Iglesia Santa María Reina, in Ponce
- Porta Coeli, in San Germán
- Church of San Mateo de Cangrejos of Santurce, in Santurce, San Juan
- Nuestra Señora de Lourdes Chapel, in Santurce, San Juan
- San José Church, in San Juan

== Archdiocese of San Juan bankruptcy ==
On January 11, 2018 Catholic Schools of the Archdiocese of San Juan filed for Chapter 11 bankruptcy, stating that the current pension plan was unworkable and applied for a new plan which has an estimated $10 million in assets and $10 million in liabilities. On March 27, 2018, local Judge Anthony Cuevas issued an embargo against the Archdiocese of San Juan which would remain in effect until they could find $4.7 million to pay for the teachers pension. It was also ruled that the Catholic Church in Puerto Rico was a single entity and that the embargo would apply to all the suffragan dioceses of the Archdiocese of San Juan. On August 30, 2018, the Archdiocese of San Juan filed for Chapter 11 bankruptcy, noting that they were unable to find the $4.7 million. Federal Judge Edward Godoy protected the archdiocese under Chapter 11, paralyzing the seizure of assets and helping them avoid the owed retirement payments. However, it was also ruled that the bankruptcy would apply to all the other Catholic dioceses in Puerto Rico.

== Episcopal conference ==
The bishops in Puerto Rico form the Puerto Rican Episcopal Conference (Spanish: Conferencia Episcopal Puertorriqueña). The episcopal conference allows the bishops to set certain norms for all of Puerto Rico, including the form of the liturgy.

== See also ==
- List of the Catholic bishops of the United States
