= List of churches in the Diocese of Mayagüez =

This is a list of current and former Roman Catholic churches in the Diocese of Mayagüez, one of the suffragan dioceses of the Archdiocese of San Juan de Puerto Rico. The jurisdiction of this diocese comprises the Puerto Rican municipalities of Aguada, Aguadilla, Añasco, Cabo Rojo, Hormigueros, Las Marías, Maricao, Mayagüez, Moca, Rincón, Sabana Grande, San Germán and San Sebastián.

The mother church of the diocese is the Cathedral of Our Lady of Candelaria in Mayagüez.

== Municipality of Aguada ==
Church name	Image	Location	Date est.	Description/notes
Inmaculada Concepción de María		Malpaso		
María Reina de la Paz		Piedras Blancas		
Nuestra Señora de las Mercedes		Carrizal		
Nuestra Señora Madre de la Consolación		Piedras Blancas		
Protomártires de la Inmaculada Concepción		Espinar	1973	Parish was established by the local community in 1973 at the historic location of a hermitage established by Dominican settlers in 1513. This was also the site of a series of attacks during the Taino rebellion. Different iterations of the hermitage existed until its abandonment in the 19th century. The ruins of the former stone hermitage are preserved within the parish.
Sagrada Familia		Jagüey		
Sagrado Corazón de Jesus		Asomante		
San Agustín		Jagüey		
San Damián		Espinar		
San Francisco de Asís		Aguada Pueblo	1692	Main town parish of Aguada, located in the Plaza Cristóbal Colón. Today served by the Augustinian Order. The current church building dates to 1926, after first church was destroyed by the 1918 earthquake.
Santa Mónica		Aguada Pueblo		Church and convent served by the served by the Augustinian Order.
Virgen del Carmen		Guaniquilla		
Virgen del Perpetuo Socorro		Río Grande		

== Municipality of Aguadilla ==
Church name	Image	Location	Date est.	Description/notes
Nuestra Señora de Fátima		Camaceyes		
Nuestra Señora de la Medalla Milagrosa		Borinquen		
Nuestra Señora del Carmen		Victoria		
Nuestra Señora del Perpetuo Socorro		Corrales		
Sagrada Familia		Corrales		
San Carlos Borromeo		Aguadilla Pueblo	1780	Main town parish of Aguadilla, located in the Plaza Rafael Hernández Marín. Designed by state architect Pedro Cobreros, built in 1783 and remodeled in 1971.
San José Obrero		Montaña	1975	Community church of the poblado San Antonio, served by the Salesians of Don Bosco.
Santos Reyes		Maleza Alta		

== Municipality of Añasco ==
Church name	Image	Location	Date est.	Description/notes
Nuestra Señora de la Monserrate y Santos Reyes		Cerro Gordo		
Nuestra Señora del Carmen		Playa		
Nuestra Señora del Perpetuo Socorro		Miraflores		
San Antonio Abad		Añasco Pueblo	1733	Main town church of Añasco, located in its main town square. A hermitage previously existed at the site since 1703. The current church building dates to 1919, as the previous structure was destroyed by the 1918 earthquake. Today served by the Discalced Carmelites.
San Lorenzo		Espino		
Santa Rosa de Lima		Añasco Arriba		

== Municipality of Cabo Rojo ==
Church name	Image	Location	Date est.	Description/notes
Cristo Rey		Boquerón		Established to serve the communities of El Combate and Pole Ojea.
Nuestra Señora de Fátima		Llanos Tuna		
Nuestra Señora del Buen Consejo		Llanos Tuna		
Nuestra Señora del Carmen		Miradero		
Sagrada Familia		Llanos Tuna		
San José		Boquerón	2011	Community parish of poblado Boquerón. Parish canonically established by Mons. Ulices Casiano Vargas in 2011.
San Juan Bautista		Miradero		
San Judas Tadeo		Bajura		
San Martín de Porres		Miradero		
San Miguel Arcángel		Cabo Rojo Pueblo	1783	Main town parish of Cabo Rojo, located in the Plaza Dr. Ramón Emeterio Betances y Alacán. The parish is heavily associated with abolitionist Ramón Emeterio Betances, whose tomb can be found in the plaza of the same name.
Santa Rita de Casia		Llanos Costa		
Schoenstatt		Miradero	1973	First permanent Schoenstatt solidarity shrine established by the Apostolic Schoenstatt Movement in Puerto Rico.

== Municipality of Hormigueros ==
Church name	Image	Location	Date est.	Description/notes
Nuestra Señora de la Asunción		Hormigueros		
Nuestra Señora de la Monserrate		Hormigueros Pueblo	1570	Minor basilica and main town parish of Hormigueros, located at the highest hill of the pueblo which gives the municipality its name. The church is closely associated with the history and folklore of the area, and has been a pilgrimage site for centuries. The basilica enshrines a 17th-century image of Our Lady of Montserrat.
Nuestra Señora de la Paz		Lavadero		
Sagrado Corazón		Lavadero		
San Judas Tadeo		Guanajibo		
San Martín de Porres		Guanajibo		
Santa Rosa de Lima		Lavadero		
Santa Teresita		Guanajibo		

== Municipality of Lajas ==
Church name	Image	Location	Date est.	Description/notes
Nuestra Señora de la Candelaria		Lajas Pueblo	1720	Main town parish of Lajas
Nuestra Señora de la Merced		Olivares	1971	

== Municipality of Las Marías ==
Church name	Image	Location	Date est.	Description/notes
Inmaculado Corazón de María		Las Marías Pueblo	1863	Main town parish of Las Marías, located in the Plaza San Carlos. Formerly a parish of the Diocese of Ponce. The current building dates to the 20th century.
La Milagrosa		Buena Vista		
Nuestra Señora de Fátima		Palma Escrita		
San José		Anones		

== Municipality of Maricao ==
Church name	Image	Location	Date est.	Description/notes
Grotto of John the Baptist		Maricao Afuera		Sculptural shrine depicting the baptism of Jesus Christ by John the Baptist, the patron saint of the town Maricao. The open-air chapel was established at the spring of a small spring that flows into the Rosario River.
Nuestra Señora de La Monserrate		Bucarabones		
Sagrada Familia Artesana		Indiera Alta		Community church of the El Treinta poblado.
Sagrado Corazón de Jesus		Montoso		
San Juan Bautista		Maricao Pueblo	1864	Main town parish of Maricao, located in the Plaza Luis Muñoz Rivera. The current church building dates to 1898. In the past it has been served by the Dominicans and the Augustinians.
Santa Rosa de Lima		Indiera Fría		

== Municipality of Mayagüez ==
Church name	Image	Location	Date est.	Description/notes
Ascención del Señor		Juan Alonso		
Cristo de los Milagros		Algarrobos		
El Buen Pastor		Mayagüez Pueblo	1986	Community parish established in 1986.
El Salvador		Guanajibo		
Nuestra Señora de Fátima		Guanajibo	1966	Elevated to parish status in 1986.
Nuestra Señora de la Candelaria		Mayagüez Pueblo	1763	Cathedral and main town church of Mayagüez, located in the Plaza Cristóbal Colón. The cathedral has existed in multiple iterations, first in wood in the 16th century before being rebuilt in stone in 1780. It was then destroyed by the 1918 earthquake and rebuilt into its third Art Deco iteration. The fourth and current Neoclassical iteration was inaugurated in 2004, with a design based on the original architecture from 1780. The cathedral is historically associated with abolitionists Segundo Ruiz Belvis and Ramón Emeterio Betances, and the baptism of freed slave children.
Nuestra Señora del Carmen		Mayagüez Pueblo	1894	Originally a small community chapel built to serve the Playa community, it was elevated to parish status in 1958. The original chapel was destroyed by the 1918 earthquake, and the current parish and parochial school buildings date to 1924.
Nuestra Señora del Perpetuo Socorro		Montoso		
Nuestra Señora del Perpetuo Socorro		Sabanetas		
Resurrección del Señor		Mayagüez Arriba	1921	Elevated to parish status in 1988. The current church building dates to 2001, as the original one was heavily damaged by Hurricane Georges.
Sagrado Corazón		Mayagüez Pueblo	1953	Elevated to parish status in 1959. Served by the Benedictines.
San Vicente de Paul		Guanajibo	1965	Erected and elevated to parish status in 1965.
Santa Ana y San Joaquín		Quebrada Grande		
Santa María del Monte Carmelo		Juan Alonso	1985	Church and convent located in Cerro Las Mesas, served by the Discalced Carmelite Sisters.
Santa Teresita del Niño Jesús		Mayagüez Pueblo	1959	Elevated to parish status in 1960. The current church building dates to 1970.

== Municipality of Moca ==
Church name	Image	Location	Date est.	Description/notes
Corpus Christi		Capá		
Cristo Rey		Cuchillas		
El Buen Pastor		Cerro Gordo		
María Auxiliadora		Marías		
Nuestra Señora de la Monserrate		Moca Pueblo	1772	Main town parish of Moca, located in the Plaza José D. Quiñones. The current church building dates to 1841, and was dedicated to Our Lady of Montserrat and John of Nepomuk in 1851.
Nuestra Señora del Rosario		Capá		
Perpetuo Socorro		Cuchillas		
Sagrado Corazón de Jesús		Naranjo		
San Guillermo Abad		Cuchillas		
San Pedro Apóstol		Rocha		
Virgen de la Providencia		Rocha		

== Municipality of Rincón ==
Church name	Image	Location	Date est.	Description/notes
Nuestra Señora del Carmen		Puntas		
Santa Rosa de Lima		Calvache		
Santa Rosa de Lima		Rincón Pueblo	1789	Main town parish Rincón, located in the Plaza Don Alfredo Raffucci Bayron. The current church building dates to 1971.

== Municipality of Sabana Grande ==
Church name	Image	Location	Date est.	Description/notes
Divino Niño Jesus		Rayo	2005	
Nuestra Señora de Fátima		Rayo	1952	Community church of Las Guaras poblado.
Nuestra Señora del Rosario		Santana	1979	
Sagrada Familia		Rincón	1999	
Sagrado Corazón de Jesús		Machuchal	1952	
San Isidro Labrador y Santa María de la Cabeza		Sabana Grande Pueblo	1814	Main town parish of Sabana Grande, located in the Plaza José A. Busigo. Formerly a parish of the Diocese of Ponce, its tower contains the oldest functioning clock in Puerto Rico.
San José		Rayo	1934	
Santa Lucía		Santana	1985	

== Municipality of San Germán ==
Church name	Image	Location	Date est.	Description/notes
María Reina del Mundo		Cotuí		
Nuestra Señora de Fatima		Cotuí		
Nuestra Señora de la Consolación		Guamá		
Nuestra Señora de la Monserrate		Rosario Peñón		
Nuestra Señora del Perpetuo Socorro		Minillas		
Nuestra Señora del Rosario		Rosario Bajo		
San Agustín		Hoconuco Bajo		
San Germán de Auxerre		San Germán Pueblo	1573	Main town parish of San Germán, located in the Plaza Francisco Mariano Quiñones. The current church building dates to 1688, and contains some of the best preserved Baroque art and architecture in the island.
San José		Hoconuco Alto		
San Judas Tadeo		Sabana Eneas		
San Martín de Porres		Caín Alto		
Santa Mónica		Minillas		
Santa Rita de Casia		Minillas		
Santa Rosa de Lima		Retiro	1966	Elevated to parish status in 1967. Served by the Augustinian Fathers.
Santo Domingo de Porta Coeli		San Germán Pueblo	1609	Former church and convent founded by the Dominican Order. It was rebuilt in 1717 and 1737 following destructive earthquakes. The convent was abandoned in the aftermath of the 1898 Spanish-American War, and the church de-consecrated and sold to the government of Puerto Rico in 1949. The church today hosts the Religious Art Museum of Puerto Rico.

== Municipality of San Sebastián ==
Church name	Image	Location	Date est.	Description/notes
Cristo Resucitado		Sonador		
Cristo Rey		Mirabales		
Espíritu Santo		Culebrinas		
Nuestra Señora de Fatima		Sonador		
Pasión del Señor		Perchas 2		
Sagrada Familia		Pozas		
Sagrado Corazón		Robles		
San Antonio de Padua		Aibonito		
San Gabriel de la Dolorosa		Calabazas		
San José Obrero		Hoya Mala		
San Pablo de la Cruz		Hato Arriba		
San Patricio		Hato Arriba		
San Sebastián Mártir		San Sebastián Pueblo	1759	Main town church of San Sebastián, located in the Plaza Ángel Gabriel Mislán Huertas. The current church building was designed by state architect Pedro Cobreros and completed in 1897.
Santa Cruz		Guacio		
Santa Teresita del Niño Jesús		Perchas 2		
