= Catedral Dulce Nombre de Jesús =

Catedral Dulce Nombre de Jesús or Catedral del Dulce Nombre de Jesús (Cathedral of the Sweet Name of Jesus) may refer to:

- Catedral Dulce Nombre de Jesús (Caguas, Puerto Rico)
- Concatedral Dulce Nombre de Jesús (Humacao, Puerto Rico)
