= Álvaro Corrada del Río =

Puerto Rican Catholic prelate (born 1942)

His Excellency, The Most Reverend Álvaro Corrada del Río S.J.
- Bishop Emeritus of Mayagüez
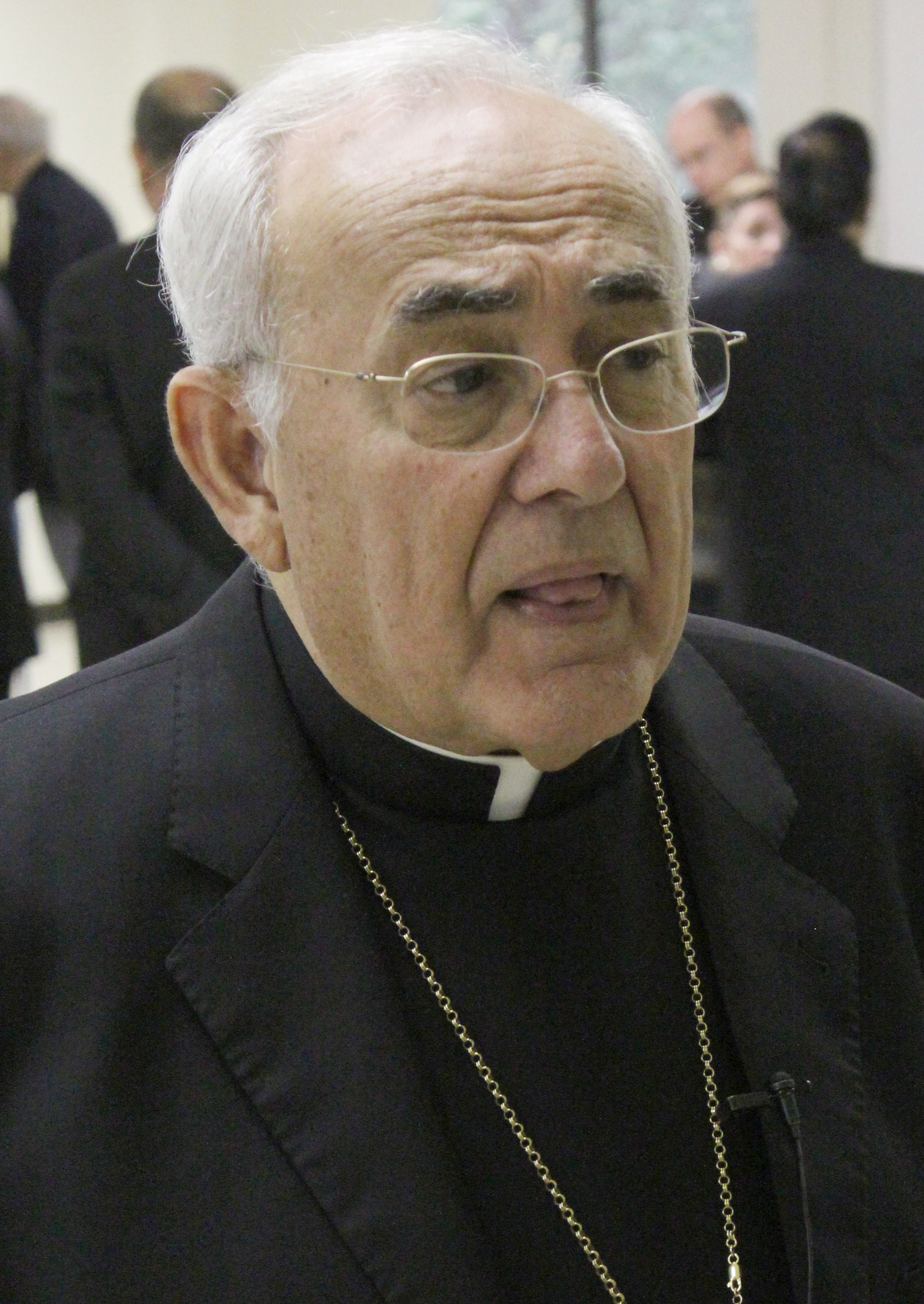
- Diocese: Mayagüez
- Appointed: July 6, 2011
- Installed: September 12, 2011
- Retired: May 9, 2020
- Predecessor: Ulises Aurelio Casiano Vargas
- Successor: Ángel Luis Ríos Matos
- Previous posts: Apostolic administrator of Arecibo (2022); Apostolic administrator of Tyler (2011‍–‍2012); Bishop of Tyler (2001‍–‍2011); Apostolic administrator of Diocese of Caguas (1997‍–‍2000); Auxiliary Bishop of the Archdiocese of Washington, D.C. and Titular bishop of Rusticiana (1985‍–‍2001)

Orders
- Ordination: July 6, 1974 by Miguel Rodriguez Rodriguez
- Consecration: August 4, 1985 by Archbishop James Hickey, Thomas William Lyons, and Eugene Antonio Marino

Personal details
- Born: May 13, 1942 (age 84) Santurce, Puerto Rico
- Education: Woodstock College; Fordham University; Catholic Institute of Paris
- Motto: Neminem nisi Iesum (Latin for 'No one but Jesus')

Styles of Álvaro Corrada del Río
- Reference style: His Excellency; The Most Reverend
- Spoken style: Your Excellency
- Religious style: Bishop

Álvaro Corrada del Río, S.J. (born May 13, 1942) is a Puerto Rican prelate of the Catholic Church and member of the Society of Jesus.

Corrada served as the Bishop of Mayagüez from 2011 until his retirement in 2020. He previously served as Bishop of Tyler in Texas from 2001 to 2011, as apostolic administrator of the Diocese of Caguas from 1997 to 2001 and as an auxiliary bishop in the Archdiocese of Washington from 1985 to 1997. He served as the apostolic administrator of the Diocese of Arecibo from March to October 2022.

== Biography ==
=== Early life ===
Álvaro Corrada was born on May 13, 1942, in the Santurce section of San Juan, Puerto Rico. He has an older brother, Baltasar Corrada del Río, who served as Mayor of San Juan. After attending the local public schools, Álvaro Corrada entered the minor seminary of what was then the Diocese of San Juan in 1955.

In 1960, Corrada entered the Society of Jesus at their novitiate in Poughkeepsie, New York. After completing his initial period of formation and professing his initial religious vows to the Jesuits, he studied at Fordham University in Bronx, New York, and later Woodstock College in Woodstock, Maryland.

=== Priesthood ===
Corrada was ordained to the priesthood for the Society of Jesus by Bishop Miguel Rodriguez Rodriguez on July 6, 1974. After his ordination, Corrada went to Paris to study at the Catholic Institute of Paris.

After returning to the United States, Corrada he was assigned as the director of spiritual retreats at Mount Manresa Jesuit Retreat House on Staten Island, New York. Following that assignment, he served as an assistant pastor at the Jesuit-run Nativity Parish on the Lower East Side of Manhattan (1980–1983). In 1983, Corrada was appointed director of the Northeast Pastoral Center for Hispanics in Manhattan.

=== Auxiliary Bishop of Washington ===
On May 31, 1985, Corrada was appointed as an auxiliary bishop of the Archdiocese of Washington, D.C., and titular bishop of Rusticiana, by Pope John Paul II. He received his episcopal consecration on August 4, 1985, from Archbishop James Hickey of, with Bishops Thomas Lyons and Eugene Marino serving as co-consecrators, at the Basilica of the National Shrine of the Immaculate Conception in Washington. Corrada selected as his episcopal motto: Neminem nisi Iesum (No one but Jesus).

Corrada was named apostolic administrator of the Diocese of Caguas in Puerto Rico as an additional responsibility on July 5, 1997.

=== Bishop of Tyler ===
Corrada was appointed by John Paul II as the third bishop of the Diocese of Tyler on December 5, 2000, and was installed on January 30, 2001.

=== Bishop of Mayagüez ===
Corrada was appointed by Pope Benedict XVI as bishop of the Diocese of Mayagüez on July 6, 2011; he was installed September 12, 2011. On May 9, 2020, Pope Francis accepted Corrada's resignation as bishop of Mayagüez after he reached the age of 75.

=== Apostolic Administrator of Arecibo ===
In March 2022, Francis appointed Corrada as the apostolic administrator of the Diocese of Arecibo, following the ouster of Daniel Fernández Torres due to his refusal to resign. He ceased being apostolic administrator when Francis appointed Alberto Arturo Figueroa Morales as bishop.

== Viewpoints ==
=== Tridentine Mass ===
Corrada was one of the earliest proponents of the Tridentine Mass following the Second Vatican Council. Before the issuance of the apostolic letter Summorum Pontificum by Pope Benedict XVI, he was singled out in an article in The Wanderer as one of the few American bishops "...who have been generous in the Ecclesia Dei indult application, as requested and emphasized repeatedly by the late Pope John Paul II.

== See also ==
- Catholic Church hierarchy
- Catholic Church in the United States
- Historical list of the Catholic bishops of Puerto Rico
- Historical list of the Catholic bishops of the United States
- List of Catholic bishops of the United States
- Lists of patriarchs, archbishops, and bishops

== Episcopal succession ==
Catholic Church titles
Preceded by Ulises Aurelio Casiano Vargas	Bishop of Mayagüez; 2011–2020	Succeeded by Ángel Luis Ríos Matos
Preceded by Edmond Carmody	Bishop of Tyler; 2000–2011	Succeeded by Joseph Strickland
Preceded by –	Auxiliary Bishop of Washington; 1985–2000	Succeeded by –
