= Gerardo Antonio Vargas Cruz =

Puerto Rican prelate

His Excellency, The Most Reverend Gerardo Antonio Vargas Cruz O.F.M.
- Coadjutor Bishop of Fajardo-Humacao
- Diocese: Fajardo-Humacao
- Appointed: September 8, 2026
- Installed: November 14, 2026

Orders
- Ordination: August 12, 2006 by Ulises Aurelio Casiano Vargas
- Consecration: November 14,2026 by Eusebio Ramos Morales, Luis Miranda Rivera and Roberto González Nieves

Personal details
- Born: December 2, 1976 (age 49) Mayagüez, Puerto Rico
- Motto: Confortavit Me Et Posuit Me In Ministerio
- Styles
- Reference style: His Excellency; The Most Reverend
- Spoken style: Your Excellency
- Religious style: Bishop

Gerardo Antonio Vargas Cruz (born December 2, 1976) is an Puerto Rican prelate who serves as Coadjutor bishop for the Diocese of Fajardo-Humacao.

== Biography ==
Gerardo Antonio Vargas Cruz, was born Dec. 2, 1976, in Mayagüez, Puerto Rico and raised in Lajas, Puerto Rico.

== Episcopal career ==
=== Ordination and early career ===
Vargas Cruz joined the Order of Friars Minor in the Franciscan Custody of the Caribbean, carrying out his novitiate in the Dominican Republic. He gave his solemn profession in 2004 and was ordained a priest on Aug. 12, 2006 at Nuestra Señora de la Candelaria Church in Lajas, Puerto Rico by Monsignor Ulises Aurelio Casiano Vargas Bishop of Mayagüez. He continued his formation in Puerto Rico at the Universidad Central de Bayamón, graduating in social service and obtaining a Master of Divinity. In the years following his ordination, Vargas Cruz has held a number of positions, including as master of novices; national assistant of the Secular Franciscan Order in Puerto Rico; deputy custos and custos of the Franciscan Custody of the Caribbean (2014 to 2017); and vicar for clergy in the San Juan Archdiocese.

Vargas also is a university professor, a director of radio programming, He served as chaplain at the Bayamón Correctional Complex 501. and one of the Franciscan animators for the Province of Our Lady of Guadalupe’s mission in Puerto Rico.

=== Diocese of Fajardo-Humacao ===
Pope Leo XIV appointed Vargas Cruz coadjutor bishop for the Diocese of Fajardo-Humacao on September 8, 2026. On November 14, 2026, Vargas Cruz was consecrated as a bishop.

== See also ==
- Catholic Church hierarchy
- Catholic Church in the United States
- Historical list of the Catholic bishops of the United States
- Historical list of the Catholic bishops of Puerto Rico
- List of Catholic bishops of the United States
- Lists of patriarchs, archbishops, and bishops

== Episcopal succession ==
Catholic Church titles
| Preceded by - | Coadjutor Bishop of Fajardo-Humacao; 2026-present | Succeeded by - |
