= Catedral Nuestra Señora de la Candelaria (Mayagüez, Puerto Rico) =

Cathedral in Mayagüez, Puerto Rico

Catedral de Nuestra Señora de la Candelaria
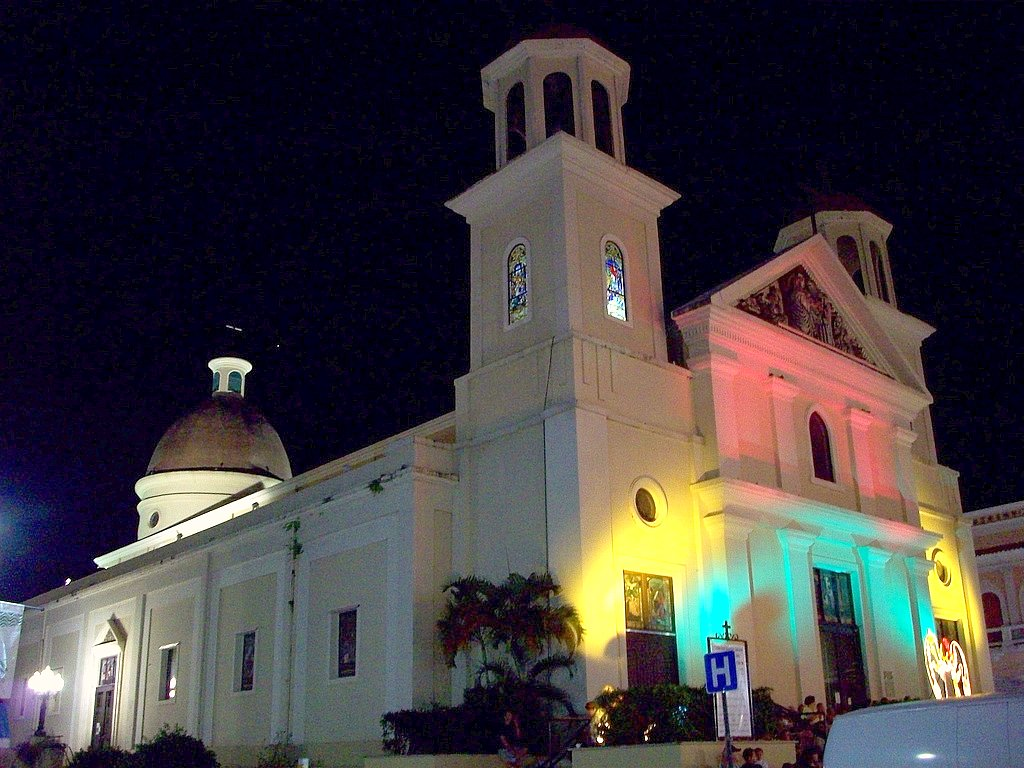

- Location of Mayagüez and the cathedral in Puerto Rico
- 18°12′04.00″N 67°08′17.68″W
- Location: Calle Candelaria, Plaza Colón, Mayagüez, Puerto Rico
- Denomination: Roman Catholic

History
- Status: Cathedral
- Consecrated: 1763

Architecture
- Style: Spanish Revival some Art Deco tones
- Groundbreaking: 1763
- Completed: 2004

Specifications
- Length: 51.26 m (168.2 ft)
- Width: 23.54 m (77.2 ft)

Administration
- Diocese: Diocese of Mayagüez

Clergy
- Bishop: Most Rev. Ángel Luis Ríos Matos

The Catedral Nuestra Señora de la Candelaria, or in English Our Lady of the Candelaria Cathedral, is the cathedral for the Roman Catholic Diocese of Mayagüez located in the eastern end of the Colón Main Square facing the town hall in Mayagüez, Puerto Rico.

== History ==
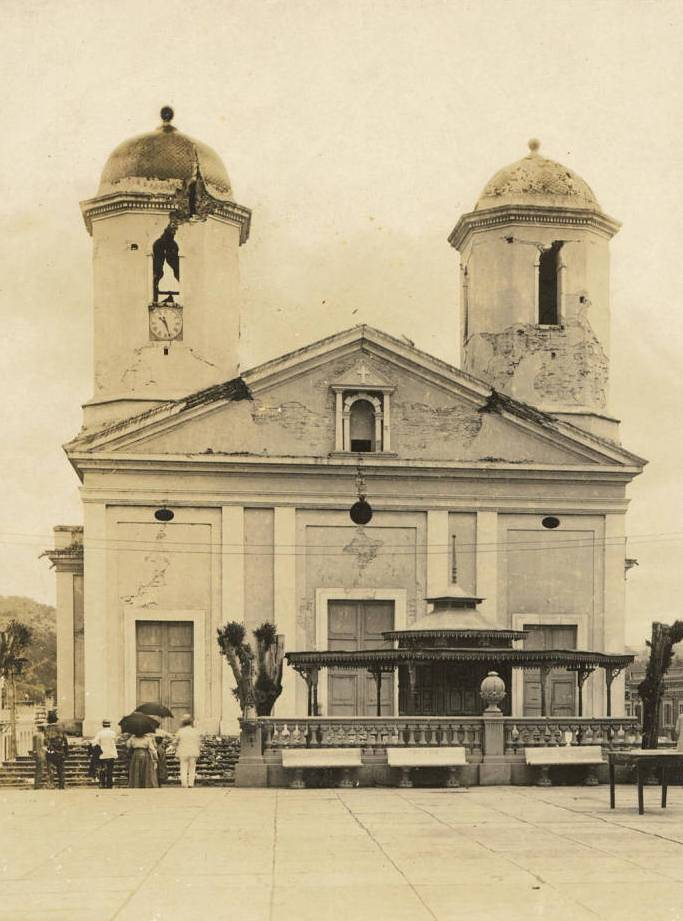
Church after the 1918 San Fermín earthquake

The first church at the current site was made of wood and was built in 1763, only three years after the founding of the city. The land was donated by Don Juan de Aponte and Don Juan de Silva; deed dated 1760 in San Germán. The plot was consecrated on August 21, 1760, and the first masonry building erected in 1780. The first church in masonry presented a more classical line than the present architectural one. At the top of its frontispiece stood a great strait-flat pediment, mounted on six semi-pilastras and a narrow and long frieze. The temple had two octagonal towers. Its architect was Vicente Piera and the approved drawings date back to 1833. On August 29, 1825, Doña Ama Mariana Bracetti Cuebas was baptized at the church and on April 12, 1839, Don Eugenio María de Hostos was also baptized there.

In 1854, a lightning-bolt struck and tore down a wedge-shaped corner of one of its right towers. The damaged tower was later rebuilt. Then in 1870, a full restoration of the building was performed. On November 10, 1900, Jose de Diego held his wedding ceremony at the church. The San Fermín earthquake on October 11, 1918, destroyed one of its towers and seriously affected the other, leaving what was left of the towers decimated. The remnant of the towers were demolished using dynamite. It was later resolved to build a second church; architect Don Luís Perocier was asked to create the plans; these were not fully accepted (1920). The church that was built departs only in its details and elements of the first plans of Mr Perocier, nevertheless they retained similar aesthetics. The previous plans, contained three doors with pointed arches and a fourth Gothic arch on the portico. The reconstruction was due to architect Don Luís f. Nieva and were started in 1922.

Pope Paul VI authorized the founding of the Diocese of Mayagüez on April 1, 1976, which led to the re-dedication of the church as a cathedral soon after. A few years later, the first bishop of the city, Mons. Ulises Casiano Vargas (who assumed the bishop's office on April 30, 1976), led the drive for the cathedral's remodeling following Perocier's original plan, including its two towers. The architect for the remodeling was Carlos Juan Ralat. The remodeling had a cost of $3,5 million and took approximately two years to complete. It was originally planned to take one year; yet, the construction was delayed after changes in the plans because of the existing deteriorated condition of the roof. The remodeling was also delayed after crypts were discovered. Among the remains discovered in the crypts were those of some of the founders of Mayagüez; Don Faustino Martínez y Don Lorenzo Martínez Matos. The remodeled cathedral was reopened on January 1, 2004, and counted with the participation of representatives of the Vatican.

== Waters of liberty ==
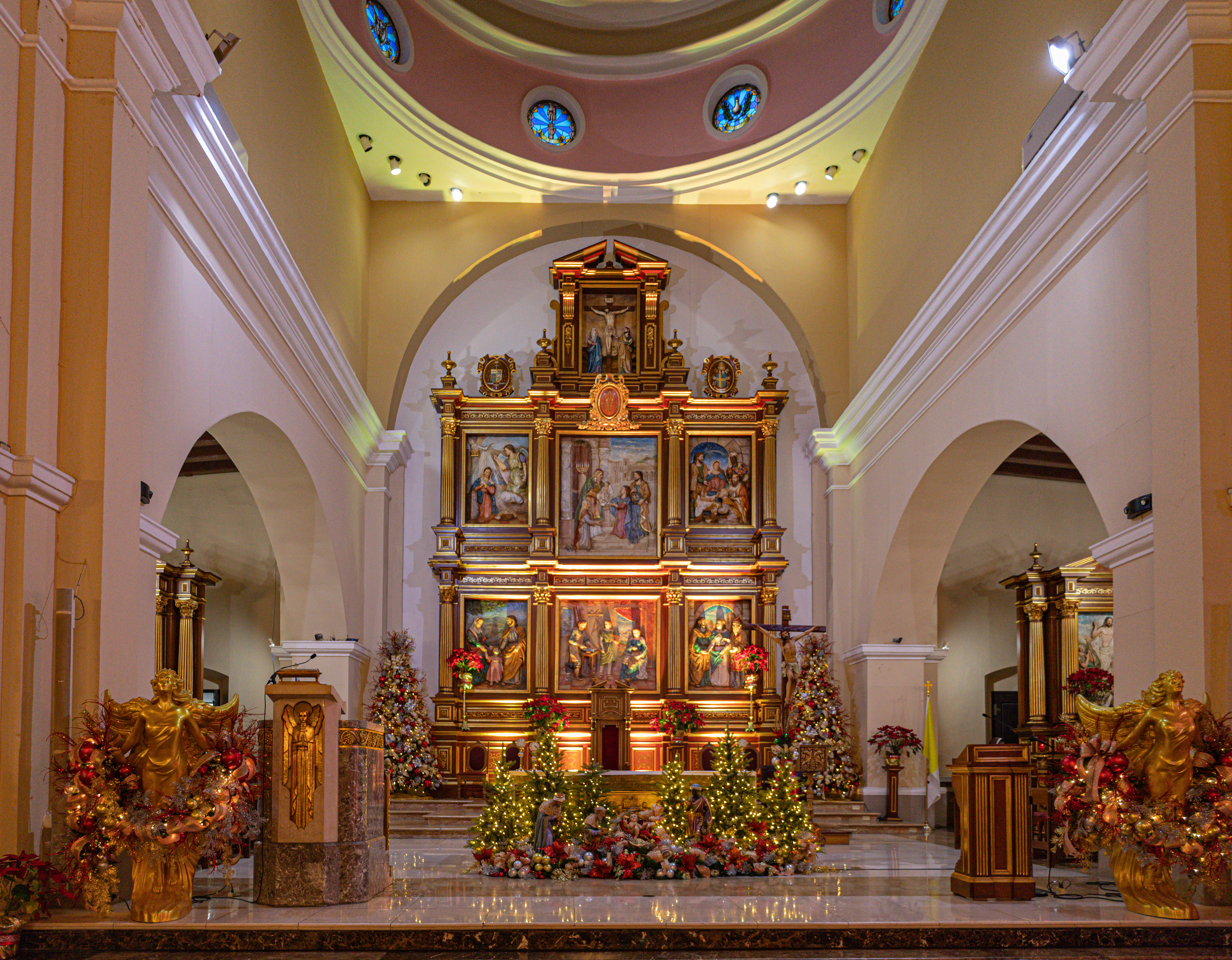
Cathedral interior

In the 19th century Segundo Ruiz Belvis and Ramón Emeterio Betances, both members of "The Secret Abolitionist Society" founded by Betances, baptized and emancipated thousands of black slave children in the church. The event, which was known as "aguas de libertad" (waters of liberty), was carried out at the Cathedrals baptismal font. The two men would buy slave children and who were then redeemed and emancipated the moment of receiving this sacrament.

Since buying the freedom of slave children cost 50 pesos if the child had been baptized, and 25 pesos if the child had not, Betances, Basora, Segundo Ruiz Belvis and other members of the society waited next to the baptismal font on Sundays, expecting a master to take a slave family to baptize their child. Before the child was baptized, Betances or his partners gave money to the parents, which they in turn used to buy the child's freedom from his master. The child, once freed, was baptized minutes after. This action was later described as having the child receive the "aguas de libertad" (waters of liberty).

The baptismal font where these baptisms were performed still exists, and is owned by a local family of merchants, the Del Moral family, who keep it at their Mayagüez house.

== See also ==
- Catholic Church in Puerto Rico
- History of Mayagüez
- List of cathedrals in the United States
- List of Catholic cathedrals in the United States
- Roman Catholic Diocese of Mayagüez
- Virgin of Candelaria
