= Ángel Luis Ríos Matos =

Roman Catholic clergyman

His Excellency, The Most Reverend Ángel Luis Ríos Matos
- Bishop of Mayagüez
- Diocese: Mayagüez
- Appointed: May 9, 2020
- Installed: August 1, 2020
- Predecessor: Álvaro Corrada del Río

Orders
- Ordination: January 11, 1985 by Ulises Aurelio Casiano Vargas
- Consecration: August 1, 2020 by Álvaro Corrada del Río, Roberto González Nieves, and Rubén González Medina

Personal details
- Born: October 5, 1956 (age 69) Aguada, Puerto Rico
- Education: Pontifical Catholic University of Puerto Rico; Pontifical Xavierian University
- Motto: Con temor y temblor (With fear and trembling)

Styles of Ángel Luis Ríos Matos
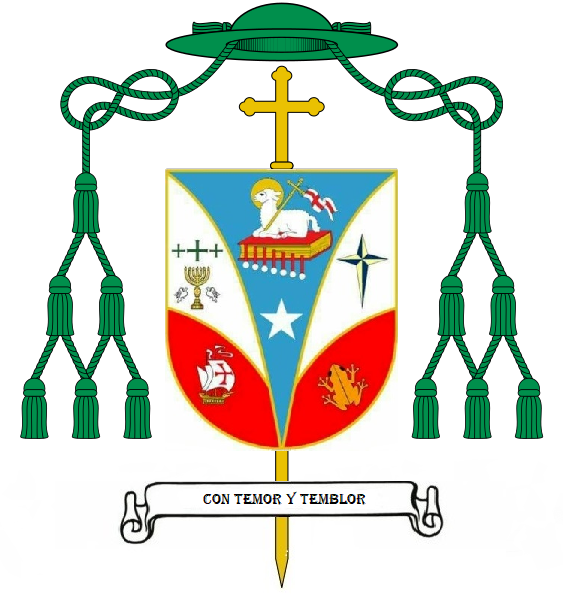
- Reference style: His Excellency; The Most Reverend
- Spoken style: Your Excellency
- Religious style: Bishop

Ángel Luis Ríos Matos (born October 5, 1956) is a Puerto Rican prelate priest of the Catholic Church who has been serving as bishop of the Diocese of Mayagüez in Puerto Rico since 2020.

== Biography ==
Ángel Ríos Matos was born on October 5, 1956, in Aguada, Puerto Rico. He received a Bachelor of Philosophy degree from the Pontifical Catholic University of Puerto Rico in Ponce, Puerto Rico. He later obtained Bachelor of Theology degree from Pontifical Xavierian University in Bogotá, Colombia and a Doctor of Canon Law degree from the same university.

On January 11, 1985, Ríos Matos was ordained to the priesthood for the Diocese of Mayagüez by Bishop Ulises Aurelio Casiano Vargas. Pope Francis appointed Ríos Matos as bishop for the Diocese of Mayagüez on May 9, 2020. On August 1, 2020, Ríos Matos was consecrated and installed as bishop by Bishop Álvaro Corrada del Río

== See also ==
- Catholic Church hierarchy
- Catholic Church in the United States
- Historical list of the Catholic bishops of Puerto Rico
- List of Catholic bishops of the United States
- Lists of patriarchs, archbishops, and bishops

== Episcopal succession ==
Catholic Church titles
Preceded by Álvaro Corrada del Río	Bishop of Mayagüez; 2020-Present	Succeeded by Incumbent
