= Iglesia Santa María Reina =

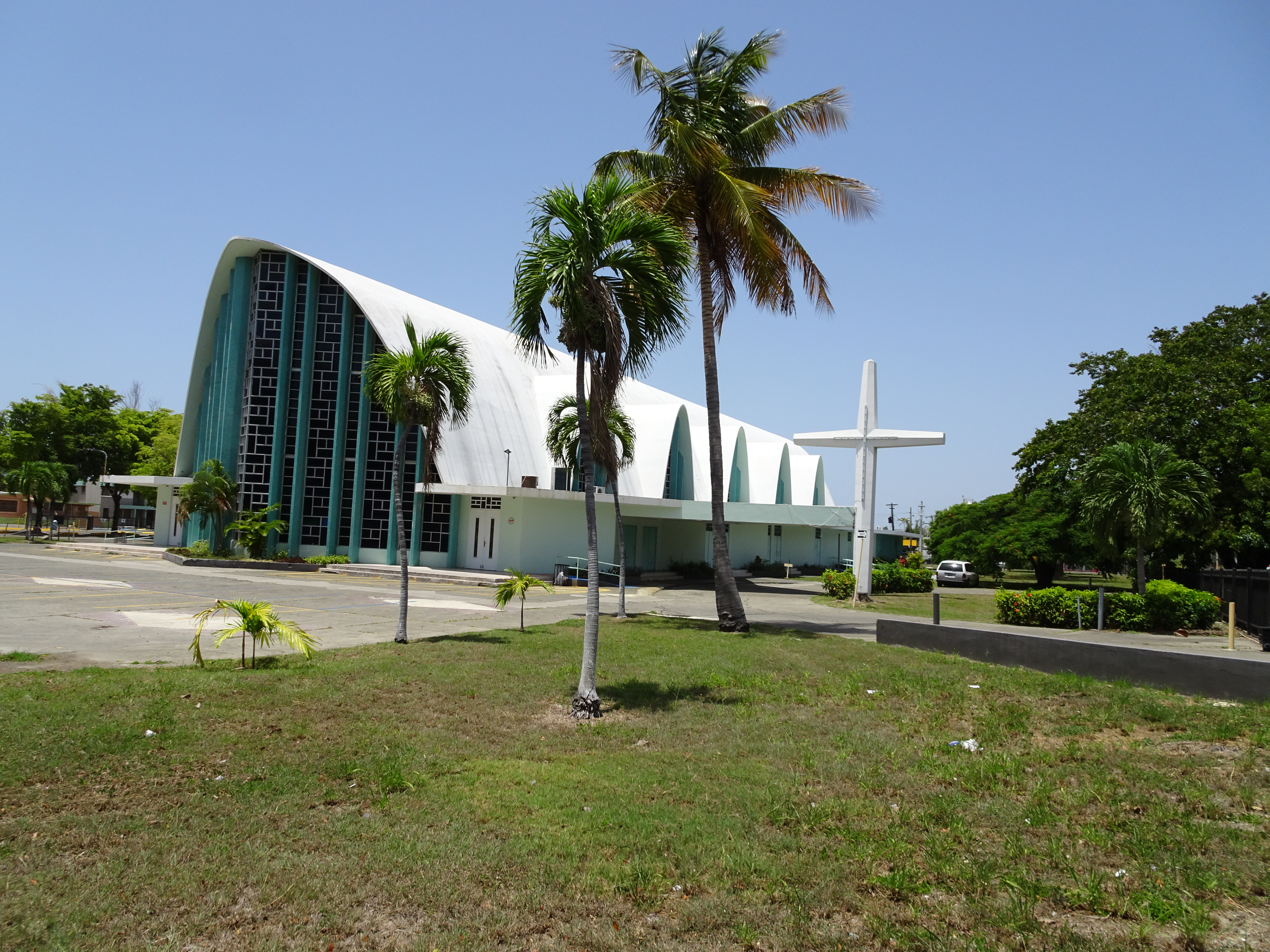
- Iglesia Santa María Reina

- Location within Puerto Rico
- 18°00′11″N 66°37′15″W
- Location: Ave. Muñoz Rivera and Ave. Las Americas, Ponce; Puerto Rico
- Denomination: Catholic
- Tradition: Christian
- Religious institute: Pauline Fathers
- Website: Weblink

History
- Status: Parish church
- Founded: 1957
- Founder(s): Mons. James Mcmannus; Mons. Vicente Murga

Architecture
- Functional status: Active
- Architect(s): Carl B. Brunner (Méndez, Brunner, Badillo & Asociados)
- Architectural type: Church
- Style: Modern, with Gothic elements
- Groundbreaking: 1955 (Note: 1954 has also been reported as the construction start date. See item #7 at "Los 6 templos religiosos históricos de Ponce: Son de gran importancia porque fueron construidos hace décadas o siglos." El Nuevo Dia. Accessed 19 July 2019. Archived.)
- Completed: 1957

Specifications
- Length: 232 feet (71 m)
- Height: 43 feet (13 m)
- Materials: Concrete

Administration
- Diocese: Roman Catholic Diocese of Ponce

Clergy
- Bishop: P. Ramón J. Arellano Devia
- Dean: P. Jerry Rivera Martínez
- Priest: Rev. Canon. Dimas Muñoz

Iglesia Santa María Reina is a Roman Catholic church in Barrio Canas Urbano, Ponce, Puerto Rico. A unique characteristic of the church is its vaulted roof.

== History ==
Built in 1957, the building houses a Roman Catholic congregation. The congregation itself was organized in 1952. The church is located at the southeast corner of the intersection of Avenida Muñoz Rivera and Avenida Las Américas, on the grounds of the Pontifical Catholic University of Puerto Rico. A visit to the temple is part of a yearly tour of temples in Ponce organized by the Pontifical Catholic University of Puerto Rico School of Architecture during Lent.

== Architecture ==
A unique characteristic of the church is its vaulted roof. Its novel architecture received an award by the American Institute of Architects "for passing the test of time." For many years, the building was the largest Catholic temple in Puerto Rico. It is a modern architecture structure with Gothic elements.
