= Thomas William Lyons =

Catholic bishop

His Excellency, The Most Reverend Thomas W. Lyons
- Auxiliary Bishop of Washington; Titular Bishop of Murthlacum
- Church: Roman Catholic Church
- Appointed: July 12, 1974
- In office: September 12, 1974 – March 25, 1988

Orders
- Ordination: May 22, 1948
- Consecration: May 19, 1964 by William Wakefield Baum

Personal details
- Born: September 26, 1923 Washington, D.C., US
- Died: March 25, 1988 (aged 64) Baltimore, Maryland, US

Thomas William Lyons (September 26, 1923 – March 25, 1988) was an American prelate of the Catholic Church in the United States. He served as an auxiliary bishop of the Archdiocese of Washington in the District of Columbia from 1974 to 1988.

Lyons is listed by the Archdiocese of Washington as being credibly accused of sexually molesting a minor.

== Biography ==
=== Early life ===
Thomas Lyons was born on September 26, 1923, in Washington, D.C. He graduated from St. Charles College High School in Catonsville, Maryland.

=== Priesthood ===
Lyons was ordained a priest by Cardinal Patrick Aloysius O’Boyle for the Archdiocese of Washington on May 22, 1948. After his ordination, Lyons served as an assistant pastor at St. John the Evangelist Parish in Silver Spring, Maryland. He was then appointed as an assistant pastor at the cathedral parish. In 1953, Lyons was appointed director of Mackin High School in Washington, serving there until 1957.

Lyons was named director of education for the archdiocesan schools in 1964, holding that post until his appointment as bishop. During this time, he also held pastoral assignments at St. Patrick's, Annunciation and St. Francis DeSales Parishes in Washington. He frequently made surprise visits to Catholic schools in the archdiocese, storing a basketball in the trunk of his car for pickup games.

=== Auxiliary Bishop of Washington ===
On July 12, 1974 Pope Paul VI appointed Lyons as the titular bishop of Murthlacum and as an auxiliary bishop of Washington. He was consecrated by Archbishop William Baum at the Shrine of the Immaculate Conception in Washington on September 12, 1974. The principal co-consecrators were Auxiliary Bishop Harold Robert Perry and Bishop Edward Herrmann.

=== Death and legacy ===
In April 1983, Lyons was severely injured in an automobile accident and required a blood transfusion. He died of hepatitis received from the transfusion at St. Agnes Hospital in Baltimore, Maryland, on March 25, 1988.

Lyons is included on a list of priests with credible accusations of sexual abuse of minors. The list was released by the Archdiocese of Washington on October 15, 2018. His victim reported the abuse to the archdiocese in 2002.
