= Diocese of Mayagüez =

Diocese of the Catholic Church

Coordinates: 18.2011°N 67.1383°W

Diocese of Mayagüez Dioecesis Maiaguezensis Diócesis de Mayagüez
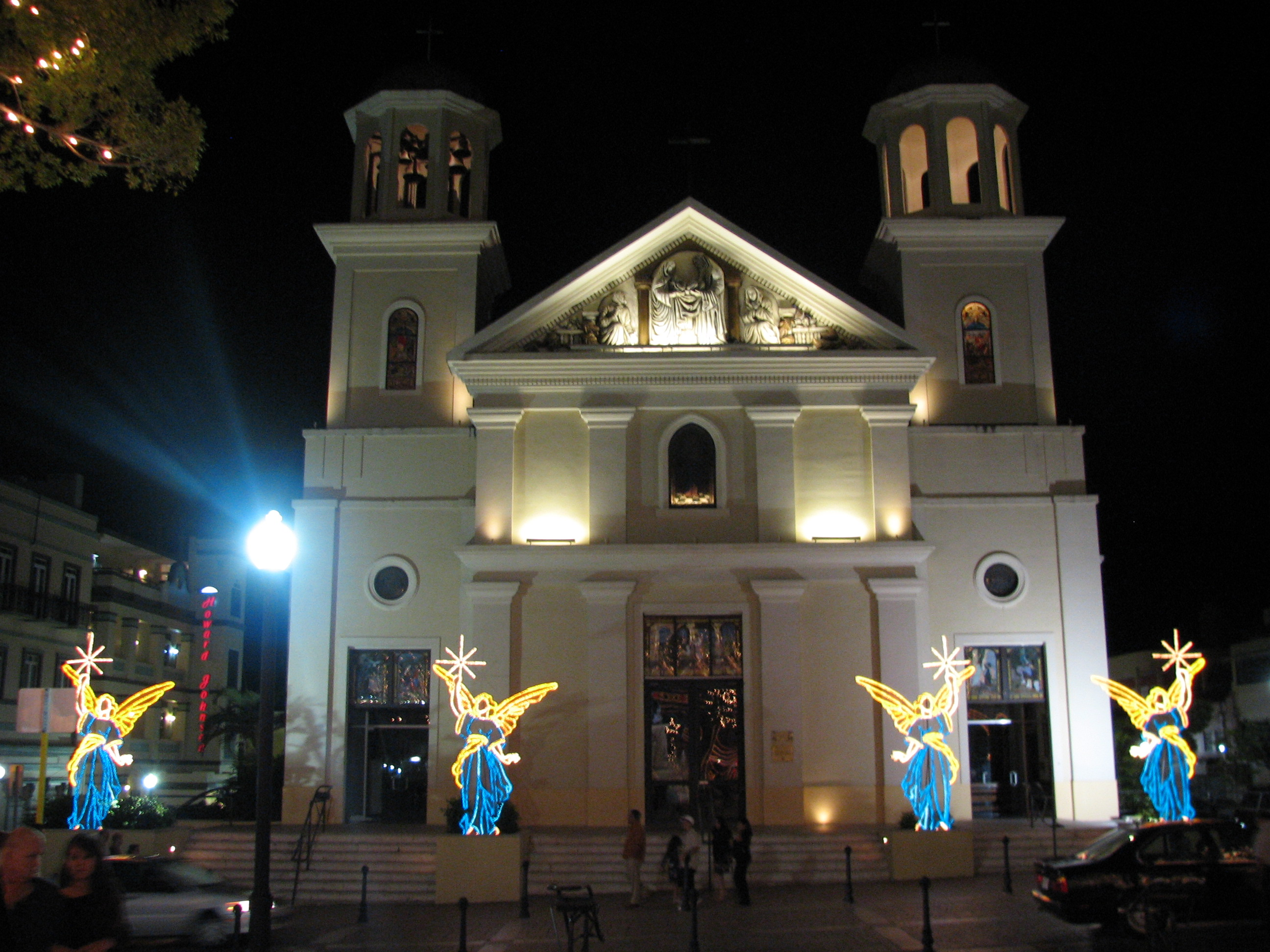
- Catedral Nuestra Señora de la Candelaria

- Coat of arms

Location
- Territory: Western coast of Puerto Rico
- Ecclesiastical province: Province of San Juan de Puerto Rico

Statistics
- Area: 1,635 km^{2} (631 sq mi)
- Population: Total; Catholics: (as of 2004); 491,518; 376,000 (76.5%)
- Parishes: 29

Information
- Denomination: Catholic
- Sui iuris church: Latin Church
- Rite: Roman Rite
- Established: 1 March 1976 (50 years ago)
- Cathedral: Catedral Nuestra Señora de la Candelaria

Current leadership
- Pope: Leo XIV
- Bishop: Ángel Luis Ríos Matos
- Bishops emeritus: Alvaro Corrada del Rio, S.J.

Map
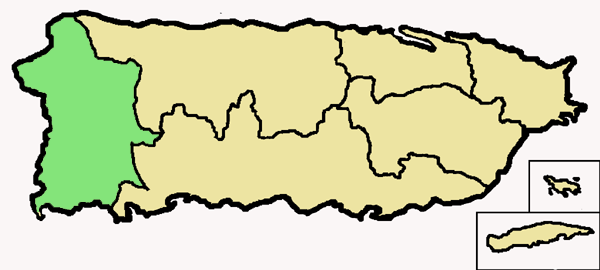

Website
- diocesisdemayaguez.org

The Diocese of Mayagüez (Latin: Dioecesis Maiaguezensis) is a diocese of the Catholic Church in the United States and consists of the western part of the island of Puerto Rico. The diocese is led by a prelate bishop, who pastors the mother church in the City of Mayagüez, Catedral Nuestra Señora de la Candelaria in front of the Plaza Colón.

== History ==
The See of Mayagüez was canonically erected on March 1, 1976, and is a suffragan diocese of the Metropolitan Province of San Juan de Puerto Rico. As of July, 2011 the bishop of the See of Mayagüez was Alvaro Corrada del Rio. He retired on May 9, 2020, and Ángel Luis Ríos Matos was appointed to succeed him.

== Ordinaries ==
The list of the Bishops of Mayagüez (Latin rite) and their tenures of service:

1. Bishop Ulises Aurelio Casiano Vargas (March 4, 1976 – July 6, 2011 Retired)
2. Bishop Alvaro Corrada del Rio, S.J. (July 6, 2011 – May 9, 2020 Resigned)
3. Bishop Ángel Luis Ríos Matos (August 1, 2020 - )

== Territory ==
The Diocese is subdivided into 29 Parishes: 17 originally located at the Diocese of Ponce, eight formerly at the Diocese of Arecibo, and four new parishes. Its jurisdiction includes the municipalities of Aguadilla, Rincón, Aguada, Moca, San Sebastián, Añasco, Mayagüez, Lajas, Las Marías, Maricao, Hormigueros, Cabo Rojo, San Germán, and Sabana Grande.

== Statistics ==
By the year 2004 its population consisted of 491,518 people, of which 376,000 were baptized, being 76.5% of the total population.

Year	Population			Priests				Deacons	Religious		Parishes
	baptised	total	%	number	secular	regular	baptised per priest		men	women
1976	352.356	?	?	56	21	35	6.292		4	105	25
1980	374.000	469.000	79,7	66	21	45	5.666		54	115	25
1990	426.000	519.000	82,1	74	40	34	5.756	2	39	149	29
1999	360.000	491.518	73,2	77	47	30	4.675	3	32	143	58
2000	360.000	491.518	73,2	71	41	30	5.070	3	32	135	58
2001	360.000	491.518	73,2	70	40	30	5.142	3	32	134	58
2002	360.000	491.518	73,2	68	38	30	5.294	4	32	133	58
2003	376.000	491.518	76,5	67	37	30	5.611	4	32	133	29
2004	376.000	491.518	76,5	70	40	30	5.371	4	32	114	29

== San Juan Archdiocese bankruptcy ==
On 7 September 2018, Judge Edward Godoy ruled that the bankruptcy filed by the Archdiocese of San Juan would also apply to every Catholic diocese in Puerto Rico, including Mayagüez, and that all would now have their assets protected under Chapter 11.
