= Ulises Aurelio Casiano Vargas =

Puerto Rican bishop (1933–2018)

His Excellency, The Most Reverend Ulises Aurelio Casiano Vargas
- Bishop Emeritus of Mayagüez
- Church: Roman Catholicism
- Archdiocese: San Juan
- Diocese: Mayagüez
- Appointed: March 4, 1976
- Installed: April 30, 1976
- Term ended: July 6, 2011
- Predecessor: First Bishop
- Successor: Álvaro Corrada del Río, S.J.

Orders
- Ordination: May 30, 1967
- Consecration: April 30, 1976 by Luis Aponte Martinez, Juan Fremiot Torres Oliver, and Miguel Rodriguez Rodriguez

Personal details
- Born: September 25, 1933 Lajas, Puerto Rico
- Died: August 5, 2018 (aged 84) San Germán, Puerto Rico
- Buried: Our Lady of the Candelaria Cathedral in Mayagüez, Puerto Rico
- Education: Pontifical Catholic University of Puerto Rico; Catholic University of America

Styles of Ulises Aurelio Casiano Vargas
- Reference style: His Excellency; The Most Reverend
- Spoken style: Your Excellency
- Religious style: Bishop

Ulises Aurelio Casiano Vargas (September 25, 1933 – August 5, 2018) was a Puerto Rican bishop emeritus of the Roman Catholic Diocese of Mayagüez, in Mayagüez.

Casiano was born at the Palmarejo ward in the nearby town of Lajas, which is also the birthplace of the first native Puerto Rican Roman Catholic cardinal, Luis Aponte Martínez. He attended the Pontifical Catholic University of Puerto Rico in nearby Ponce, from which he graduated with a bachelor's degree in education (Social Sciences) in 1955. He then became a schoolteacher and school administrator, with a reputation for efficiency. He then joined the university's Regina Cleri Seminar, and continued Theology studies at Our Lady of Angels seminar in New York. Casiano was eventually ordained a priest on May 30, 1967. He later obtained a Juris Doctor degree in Canonical Law from the Catholic University of America in Washington, D.C.

Monsignor Casiano was named first bishop for the newly created Diocese of the Mayaguez by Pope Paul VI on March 3, 1976, and was consecrated by Cardinal Aponte Martínez on April 30, 1976.

A former choirmaster while studying at the Regina Cleri seminar, Casiano has promoted the development of the musical ministries associated with the Mayagüez diocese. For instance, every Good Friday, at the reading of the Seven Words of Jesus on The Cross at Mayagüez's cathedral, the sermon features a musical piece, in seven parts, written by local music professor José Antonio Gaudier (The Elder) in 1873, and played by the diocese's philharmonic orchestra.

Monsignor Casiano has earned two nicknames among mayagüezanos. His stamina, charisma and tenacity earned him the name The Obispator, a portmanteau of the Spanish word for bishop, obispo, and The Terminator (the movie character played by Arnold Schwarzenegger). As he has successfully achieved the construction or remodeling of various diocese landmarks (such as Mayagüez's cathedral) he has also been nicknamed "Ulises Trump".

Bishop Casiano retired on July 6, 2011. Pope Benedict XVI named Alvaro Corrada del Rio as his successor.

Ulises Aurelio Casiano Vargas died on Sunday August 5, 2018 at Hospital de la Concepción de San Germán, Puerto Rico at age 84. He was buried at Our Lady of the Candelaria Cathedral in Mayagüez, Puerto Rico.

== See also ==
- Catholic Church hierarchy
- Catholic Church in the United States
- Historical list of the Catholic bishops of Puerto Rico
- Historical list of the Catholic bishops of the United States
- List of Catholic bishops of the United States
- Lists of patriarchs, archbishops, and bishops

== Episcopal succession ==
Catholic Church titles
New title	Bishop of Mayagüez; 1976–2011	Succeeded by Álvaro Corrada del Río, S.J.
