= Diocese of Fajardo–Humacao =

Latin Catholic jurisdiction in Puerto Rico

Coordinates: 18.3249°N 65.6532°W

Diocese of Fajardo–Humacao Dioecesis Faiardensis–Humacaensis Diócesis de Fajardo–Humacao
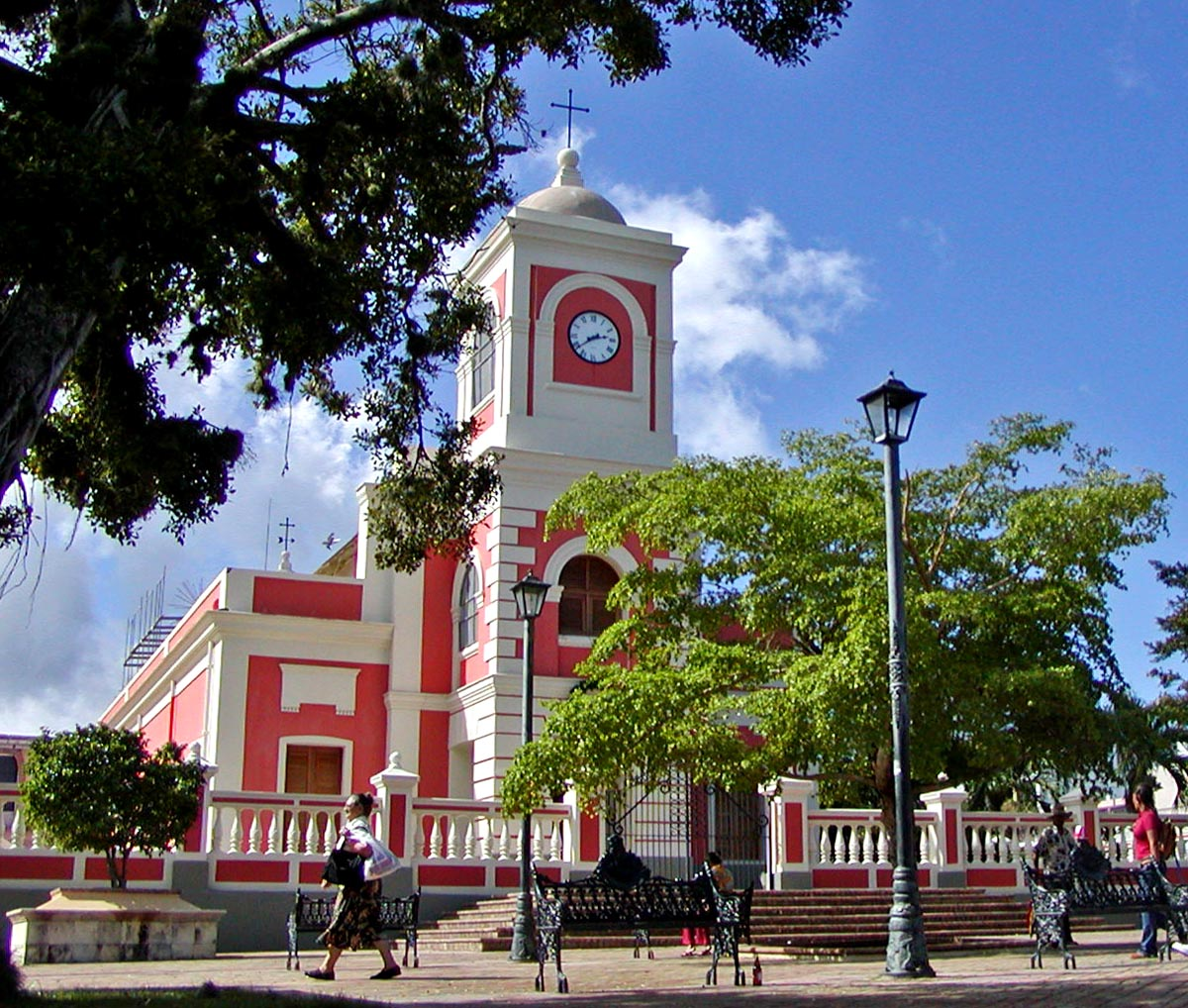
- Catedral Santiago Apostol

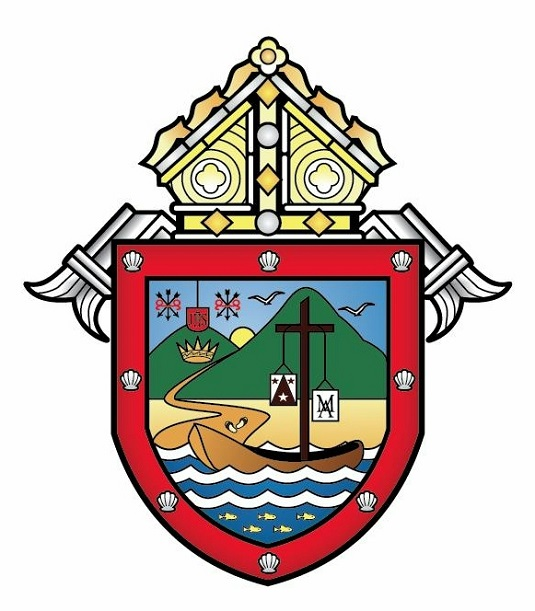
- Coat of arms

Location
- Territory: East and Northeast portions of the island of Puerto Rico
- Ecclesiastical province: San Juan de Puerto Rico

Statistics
- Area: 221 sq mi (570 km^{2})
- Population: Total; Catholics: (as of 2016); 296,000; 99,500 (33.6%)

Information
- Denomination: Roman Catholic
- Rite: Roman Rite
- Established: 11 March 2008 (18 years ago)
- Cathedral: Catedral Santiago Apostol
- Co-cathedral: Concatedral Dulce Nombre de Jesus

Current leadership
- Pope: Leo XIV
- Bishop: Luis Miranda Rivera, O. Carm.
- Coadjutor: Gerardo Antonio Vargas Cruz, O.F.M.

Map
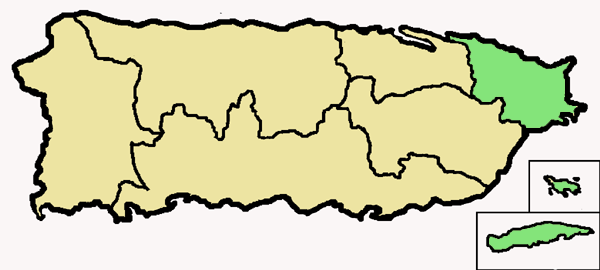

The Diocese of Fajardo–Humacao(Latin: Dioecesis Faiardensis–Humacaensis) is a diocese of the Catholic Church and consists of part of the east and the northeast of the island of Puerto Rico. The current bishop is Luis Miranda Rivera. The mother church is Cathedral Santiago Apóstol in Fajardo.

== History ==
The See of Fajardo–Humacao was canonically erected on May 11, 2008 and is a suffragan diocese of the Metropolitan Province of San Juan de Puerto Rico. Its jurisdiction includes the municipalities of Loíza, Canóvanas, Río Grande, Luquillo, Fajardo, Ceiba, Naguabo, Humacao, Culebra, and Vieques.

== Bishops ==
1. Eusebio Ramos Morales (March 11, 2008 – February 2, 2017), later Bishop of Caguas
2. Luis Miranda Rivera, O. Carm. (August 15, 2020 – present)

== Coadjutor Bishops ==
1. Gerardo Antonio Vargas Cruz (November 14, 2026 – present)

== San Juan Archdiocese bankruptcy ==
On 7 September 2018, Judge Edward Godoy ruled that the bankruptcy filed by the Archdiocese of San Juan would also apply to every Catholic diocese in Puerto Rico, including Fajardo-Humacao, and that all would now have their assets protected under Chapter 11.

== Gallery ==
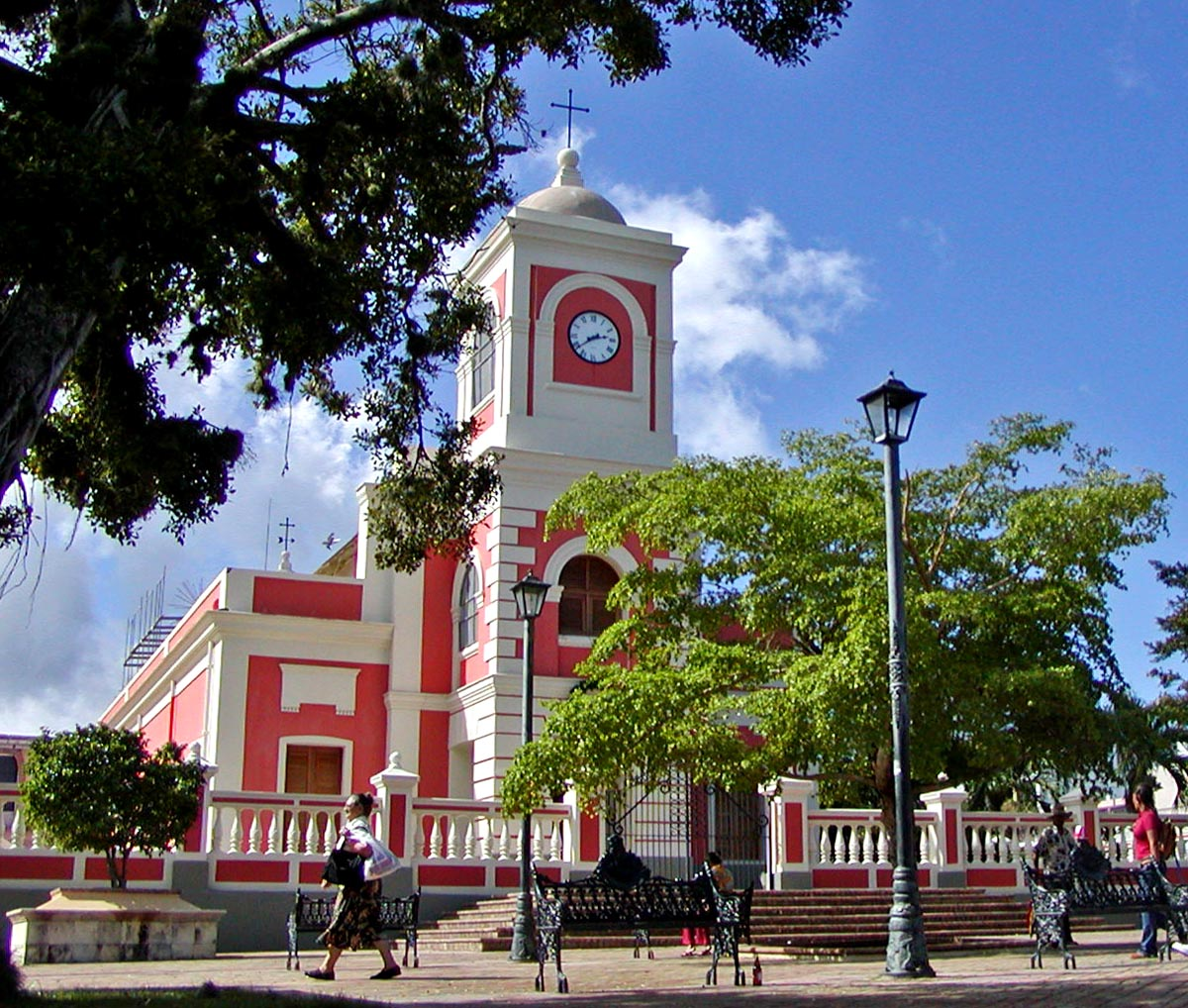
Catedral Santiago Apóstol in Fajardo

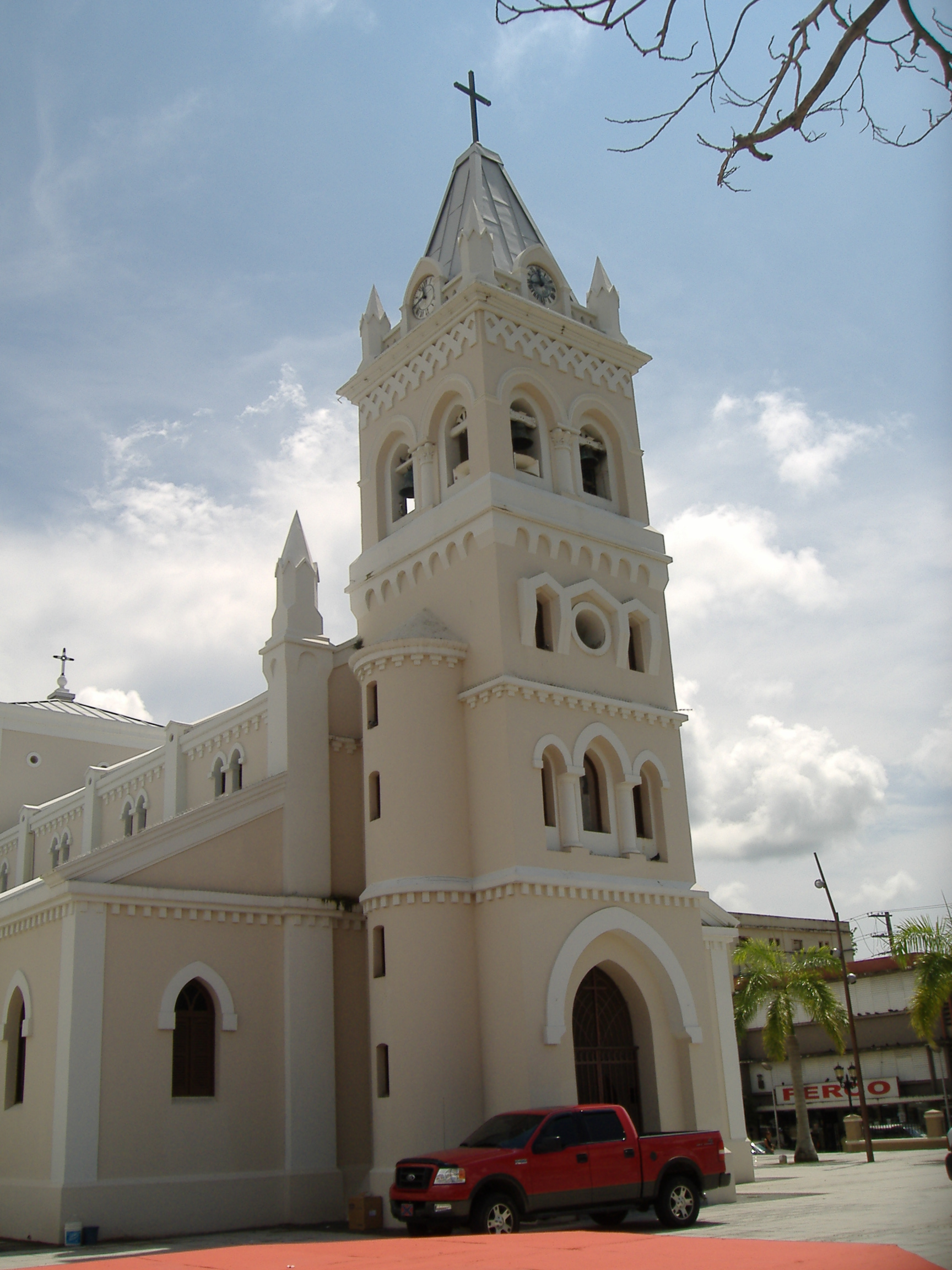
Concatedral Dulce Nombre de Jesus in Humacao
