= Catedral Santiago Apóstol (Fajardo, Puerto Rico) =

Historic cathedral in Fajardo, Puerto Rico

- Church Santiago Apóstol of Fajardo
- U.S. National Register of Historic Places
- Puerto Rico Historic Sites and Zones
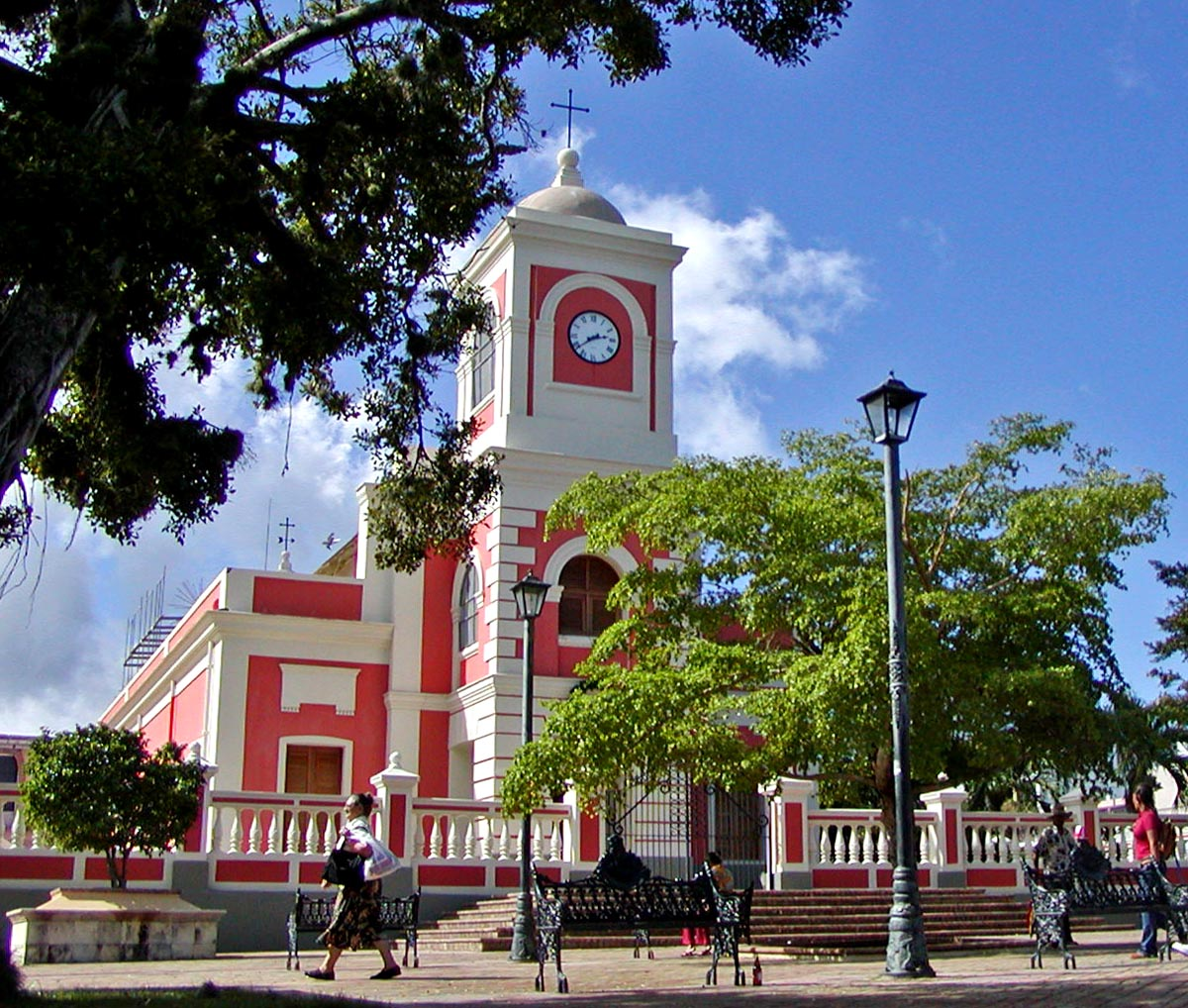

- Location within Puerto Rico
- Location: Town Plaza; Fajardo, Puerto Rico
- Coordinates: 18°19′37″N 65°39′12″W
- Architect: Don Pedro A. Beibal
- MPS: Historic Churches of Puerto Rico TR
- NRHP reference No.: 84003144
- RNSZH No.: 2000-(RE)-18-JP-SH

Significant dates
- Added to NRHP: September 18, 1984
- Designated RNSZH: May 16, 2001

The Catedral Santiago Apóstol, or in English, the Cathedral of St. James the Apostle, or Santiago Apóstol of Fajardo is a Catholic cathedral located on the town plaza in Fajardo, Puerto Rico. Along with Concatedral Dulce Nombre de Jesús or in English, the Co-cathedral Sweet Name of Jesus, in Humacao it is the seat of the Diocese of Fajardo-Humacao. It was listed on the National Register of Historic Places as Church Santiago Apóstol of Fajardo in 1984.

== History ==
The parish was established in 1766 and the first church building was completed in 1776. It was destroyed by an earthquake in 1867. Construction of the present church began two years later utilizing the side walls and floor tiles of the previous church. It became a cathedral church when Pope Benedict XVI established the Diocese of Fajardo-Humacao on March 11, 2008.

== Architecture ==
The building was designed by Don Pedro A. Beibal. It is located on the north side of the town plaza and is surrounded by a balustrade concrete wall with pillars that features metal grillwork gates. A square bell tower dominates the main façade. The bells are in the third level contained within open arches. Two small windows flank the tower and define the side naves on the interior. The side facades feature a doorway and four windows. A large parish house, which was built later, blocks the back of the cathedral from view.

Simple pillars divide the main nave from the side aisles in the interior. The five pillars divide the space into six bays. The first bay includes the vestibule and features a spiral wooden staircase to the choir loft. The apse is square in shape and is crowned by a brick lanterned dome.

== See also ==
- Catholic Church by country
- Catholic Church in the United States
- Ecclesiastical Province of San Juan de Puerto Rico
- Global organisation of the Catholic Church
- List of Catholic cathedrals in the United States
- List of cathedrals in the United States
