= Arnold Potter =

American LDS Church leader (1804–1872)

Founder of the 'Church of the Potter Christ'
- 1857 – 1872

Personal details
- Born: January 11, 1804; Herkimer County, New York, United States
- Died: April 2, 1872 (aged 68); Council Bluffs, Iowa, United States

Arnold Potter (January 11, 1804 – April 2, 1872) was a self-declared Messiah and a leader of a schismatic sect in the Latter Day Saint movement. Potter referred to himself as Potter Christ.

== Biography ==
Potter was born in Herkimer County, New York. At age 19, he married Almira Smith. By 1835 Potter had moved with his wife and children to Switzerland County, Indiana. On November 10, 1839, Potter and his family were baptized by missionaries of the Church of Jesus Christ of Latter Day Saints.

In April 1840, Potter and his family moved to Nauvoo, Illinois, to join the main gathering of Latter Day Saints. On April 24, 1840, Potter was given the Melchizedek priesthood and ordained to the priesthood office of elder by Joseph Smith. On June 1, 1840, Potter received a patriarchal blessing from church patriarch Joseph Smith Sr. Potter settled in Sand Prairie, Iowa, where he was the presiding elder of the church. In January 1845, Potter became a seventy in the church.

In 1848, Potter traveled to the Salt Lake Valley as a Mormon pioneer. By 1856, he had moved from Utah Territory to San Bernardino, California. On March 16, 1856, Potter received a call to serve as a missionary in Australia from LDS Church president Brigham Young. Later that year, Potter left California for Australia on the ship Osprey.

Potter later claimed that during his trip to Australia, he underwent a "purifying, quickening change" whereby his own spiritual body, called "Christ", entered into his body and he became "Potter Christ, Son of the living God". During his time in Australia, Potter wrote a book which he said was dictated to him by angels; it was described by Potter as the book from which all people were to be judged at the Final Judgment.

Potter returned to California by October 1857. A Latter-day Saint observer described Potter's re-appearance in the community:

Wednesday 21 October 1857—Arnold Potter, who calls himself Potter Christ, appeared in our streets today with a brand on his forehead which had been put in with India ink. The words which can be read at quite a distance, are "Potter Christ—The Living God—Morning Star". To the right of the inscription is a star, below a cross. He appears very desirous of winning followers. It is said there are several apostates about to join him.

By 1861, Potter and some of his followers had left California with the intention of settling near Independence, Missouri, the traditional location of Zion for the Latter Day Saints. They settled at Saint Marys in northwest Mills County, Iowa. When Saint Marys was destroyed by flooding in 1865, they moved to Council Bluffs, Iowa. Potter spent his days wandering the streets in Council Bluffs wearing a long white robe and became a local oddity. Potter's followers in Council Bluffs were described as "few but devout". The men wore black robes and the women eschewed normal grooming practices. Potter and his followers held enthusiastic prayer meetings which would often culminate in Potter declaring a new revelation from God.

In 1872, Potter announced at a meeting of his church that the time had come for his ascent into heaven. Followed by his disciples, Potter rode a donkey to the edge of the bluffs, whereupon he leapt off the edge intending to "ascend," but instead fell to his death. His body was collected and buried by his followers.

== Works ==
- Potter, Arnold (1870). Revelations of Potter Christ, the messenger of the new covenant. Council Bluffs, Iowa Evening Bugle News.

== See also ==
- List of messiah claimants
- List of people claimed to be Jesus
- Messiah complex
