= Vandalism of Michelangelo's Pietà =

1972 act of damage to a 15th-century sculpture

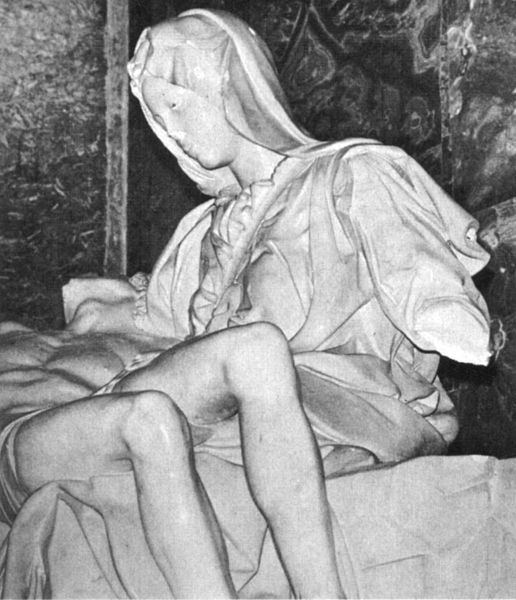
A detail view of the Pietà with damaged arm, nose and eye, May 1972

On 21 May 1972, Michelangelo's Pietà statue, located in St. Peter's Basilica, Vatican City, was attacked by Laszlo Toth, a Hungarian geologist who believed he was Jesus Christ. With fifteen blows, he removed Mary's arm at the elbow, knocked off a chunk of her nose, and chipped one of her eyelids. He was subdued by bystanders, including American sculptor Bob Cassilly, who struck Toth several times before pulling him away from the statue. Another man, firefighter Marco Ottaggio, grabbed Toth by the hair to keep him out of reach.

== Culprit ==
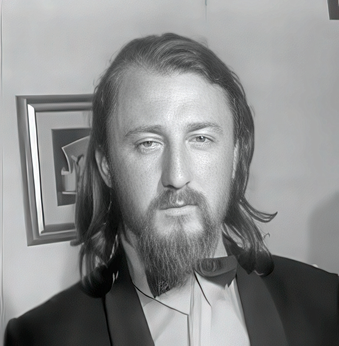
Toth in 1972

Toth (Hungarian: Tóth László) was born on 1 July 1938 in Pilisvörösvár, Hungary, to a Catholic family. After graduating with a degree in geology, he moved to Australia in 1965. As his English was poor and his geology diploma was not recognised, he initially worked at a soap factory. In June 1971, he moved to Rome, Italy, knowing no Italian, intending to become recognised as Christ. He sent letters to Pope Paul VI and unsuccessfully attempted to meet him. Toth was stateless at the time of the attack on the statue.

At 33 years of age (the traditional age of Jesus at his death) on the Feast of Pentecost, Toth, wielding a geologist's hammer and shouting "I am Jesus Christ—risen from the dead", attacked the statue. Following his arrest, Toth repeated his claim that he was Christ and said that God had compelled him to destroy the statue because Christ, being eternal, could not have a mother. In addition, Toth claimed to be Michelangelo. Toth was kept in custody and on 28 January 1973, a magistrate court ordered a minimum of two years confinement at a mental hospital. He was released in early 1975 and slated for deportation back to Australia. An initial attempt via a Qantas flight on 21 January failed after the pilot refused to let Toth board without police presence. Toth was deported on 29 January, accompanied by two security officers, but without further restrictive measures. Upon his return to Australia, psychiatrists there did not consider him dangerous, and he has not been heard of since.

== Aftermath ==
After some debate, it was decided to perform as close to an "invisible" restoration as possible. Restorers took five months to identify over 100 fragments and reattached them using glue along with powder from Carrara marble (discovering in the process a hitherto unknown initial M carved on Mary's palm by the sculptor). One piece of the statue had been taken by an American tourist during Toth's arrest, but it was voluntarily sent back for the restoration a few months later. The restored statue went back on display ten months after the attack, now separated from the public by a pane of bullet-proof glass.

== In popular culture ==
- Toth is the eponymous inspiration for books of letters by Don Novello.
- Comic book artist Steve Ditko used Toth's actions as the central metaphor in his 1992 examination of issues concerning creation and destruction, Lazlo's Hammer (corrected to "Laszlo's Hammer" in subsequent reprints and revisions).

== See also ==
- List of messiah claimants
- List of people claimed to be Jesus
- Messiah complex
