= José Luis de Jesús =

Puerto Rican self-declared messiah

José Luis de Jesús Miranda
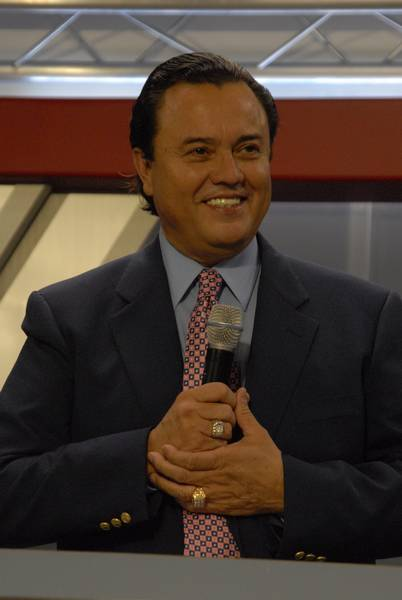
- José Luis de Jesús in 2008
- Born: April 22, 1946; Ponce, Puerto Rico
- Died: November 17, 2013 (aged 67); Orlando, Florida
- Other names: The Antichrist; Jesochristo Hombre; Melchizedek; Father/Dad/Daddy
- Occupation: Pastor
- Organization: Growing in Grace International
- Known for: Eschatological preaching, founding religious sect
- Criminal charges: Petty theft, DUI
- Criminal penalty: Incarceration - 9 months
- Spouse(s): Josefina Torres (Divorced), Nydia Vélez (Divorced)
- Children: Four daughters, one son

José Luis de Jesús Miranda (April 22, 1946 – November 17, 2013) was the leader of the Creciendo en Gracia cult, based in Miami, Florida. He claimed to be both the returned phase of Jesus Christ and the Antichrist; he was known for making statements that opposed the precepts of the Roman Catholic Church but that followed his interpretation of the Bible. He was previously known as el Jesucristo Hombre (which translates, roughly, to "the Man Jesus-Christ") but shortly after his death, his followers granted him the title of Melchizedek because, as stated by his official site, he attained his new and final name which means king of justice and king of peace. Footage from one of his sermons as well as an interview with comedian Bill Maher are included in the 2008 documentary film Religulous.

== Early life ==
José Luis de Jesús was born in Ponce, Puerto Rico, to parents Antonio de Jesús and Ana Luisa Miranda. He claimed that during his youth, he served stints in prison for petty theft because of the poor conditions that he was living in, and that he was already addicted to heroin at age 14. He stated that it was the "power of God what took me out of my drug addiction" and he soon joined a Baptist Church in his city.

== Growing in Grace ==
José Luis was promoted to minister after serving several years in the church. Miranda claims that in 1973, he had a vision in which he maintains that he was visited by a pair of angels. The impact on Miranda was significant; as he later told ABC News: "The same spirit that was in Jesus of Nazareth, and the same spirit is in me. He came to me. He [integrated] with my person in 1973." It was not long before Miranda started preaching his own ideals and teachings. José Luis moved his then-wife Nydia and five children to South Florida, where he secured a 15-minute time slot from the radio station WVCG-AM to begin preaching.

He started to assemble a select number of followers which culminated in the forming of Ministerio Creciendo en Gracia (Spanish for Growing in Grace) in 1988. At first, José Luis was only preaching according to the Four Gospels that narrate the life and teachings of Jesus Christ, but in 1998, he claimed that he was the reincarnation of Paul the Apostle and changed his focus into reading and preaching about Paul's gospel.

=== Movement outreach ===
Creciendo en Gracia first started in Miami, Florida, and soon expanded into different places in the United States and Latin America. On April 22, 2002, he married Josefina Torres, a woman that he met during one of his trips to Bogotá in 1999. In 2005, he announced that he was the next phase of Jesus Christ on Earth and self-proclaimed Jesus Christ Man. In 2007, the Dallas Morning News reported that de Jesús "preaches to followers in some 35 nations, mostly in Latin America, and has 287 radio programs and a 24-hour Spanish and English-language TV-network". He claimed to have two million followers in 30 countries by 2008.

== Death ==
On August 8, 2013, Miranda's ex-wife, Josefina Torres, claimed that Miranda had died in Sugar Land, Texas, on August 8, 2013, apparently of cirrhosis. However, on September 11, Miranda reappeared in public, proclaiming himself in good health. On November 15, Miranda actually died in Orlando, Florida, with his death confirmed by both his movement and his family. Miranda's death has remained controversial among his followers. Publicly, his church has continued to insist that Miranda has not "died" and that he is immortal. He was buried on November 22, 2013, in a ceremony in which only his family and certain followers attended.

== Beliefs ==
=== Antichrist ===
In late 2006, he claimed that he was the Antichrist. He stated that the term was appropriate because people are no longer required to follow the "Jewish teachings" of Jesus of Nazareth, but rather to follow the apostle Paul's teachings through De Jesús. According to de Jesús, "Antichrist" means "no longer following Jesus of Nazareth as he lived in the days of his flesh". Followers showed their support by getting "666" tattoos on their bodies. One of Miranda's followers in Havana, Cuba tattooed the symbol on her three-year-old son. A YouTube video of the mother holding the child as he was tattooed was widely circulated in January 2013. "666", de Jesús said, is not a sign of the devil (he preaches that the devil was destroyed) but instead is the number of the Antichrist and that the number is "a number of wisdom and it displays who is really following the truthful words of Jesus Christ".

=== Christmas ===
His followers celebrate Christmas each year on April 22, as this is the day de Jesús was born and therefore they claim it is the "real" Christmas.

=== Transformation ===
According to his followers, there was to have been a Transformation day in which members would have supposedly been able to walk through walls and go through fire and not get burned, this because they would have been "fully enlightened and living with an immortal body". José Luis stated that his transformation and that of his followers would occur between June 30, 2012, and July 1, 2012 (sources Huffington Post and Miami New Times dispute the exact hour).

== Controversies ==
=== Divorce ===
José Luis de Jesús Miranda separated from his wife in 2007 because, according to her, "he started to say that he was God; I was not comfortable with that, so he threatened me by sending death-angels to my sons if I didn't do whatever he wanted". She also alleged that he liked to send her far away from home for long periods of time because "he was seeing other women, some of them from Creciendo en Gracia".

Documents provided to the court by Josefina's attorney demonstrated that José Luis spent extravagantly during the time of the marriage, and used church funds to maintain his lifestyle. One gambling debt to Hard Rock Casino was over $46,000. Jo-Ann De Jesús, José Luis' daughter and Church treasurer, testified that de Jesús' first wife, Nydia Vélez, receives $12,000 in monthly alimony paid for by the church. Finally, the church bought multiple properties for José Luis in Florida, Texas and Colombia using Church funds and signing the title over to José Luis or Jo-Ann De Jesús.

Roberto Piñeiro, the judge in charge of the divorce case, gave an unfavorable verdict towards de Jesús in 2008 and, according to the Miami Herald, Josefina Torres received $2.2 million in properties and estates as compensation.

== Disappearance of "Creciendo en Gracia" and groups emerged from this sect ==
After the death of José Luis de Jesús Miranda, the great majority of the followers did not want anything more to do with the sect, but some decided to remain united. However, because of the internal struggles for leadership and rival ambition of their leaders, after six months the group had already divided into four factions with different doctrinal positions and social agendas. As a result, it can be said that the sect really ended with the death of José Luis de Jesús Miranda, and that the four factions, which have only retained a meager influence, constitute new movements. These are:

- "La Amada de Jesucristo" ("The Beloved of Jesus Christ") or "Paloma" ("Dove"), directed by Andrés Cudris [Already deceased],
- "La Ciencia de JH" ("The Science of JH"), directed by Emilio Gramajo,
- "TV Gracia" ("Grace TV") directed by Luis Martín Guío, and
- "Rey de Salem, El Gobierno de Dios, Melquisedec-Lisbeth", ("King of Salem, The Government of God") Lisbeth García

== See also ==
- List of people who have claimed to be Jesus
- List of dates predicted for apocalyptic events
- Messiah complex
- List of Puerto Ricans
- List of messiah claimants
