= Inri Cristo =

Brazilian astrologer

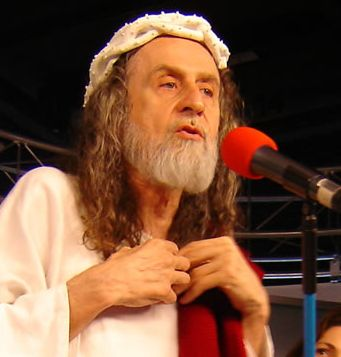
- Inri Cristo on TV
- Born: Álvaro Thais; March 22, 1948 (age 78); Indaial, Santa Catarina, Brazil
- Occupation: Cult leader
- Website: www.inricristo.org.br

Álvaro Thais (Portuguese pronunciation: [ˈawvɐɾu ˈtajs]; March 22, 1948) is a Brazilian astrologer, better known as Inri Cristo (pronounced [ˈĩʁi ˈkɾistu]) who claims to be the reincarnation of Jesus. He later moved to Curitiba, where he became famous as a persona in comedy television programs, getting to participate in a widely circulated advertising campaign.

Inri Cristo regularly participates in lively debates with religious figures, such as priest Óscar González-Quevedo (whom Álvaro claims to have been the reincarnation of the Spanish Inquisitor Tomás de Torquemada), and also appears in interviews and comedy shows. He has made provocative statements about evolutionism and vegetarianism.

== Early life ==
Inri Cristo was raised by two Roman Catholic farmers of German ancestry: Wilhelm and Magdalena Theiss.

== Public speaking and religious activities ==
In 1969, at the age of 21, Inri began his public life as a self-professed prophet and astrologer, introducing himself as "Iuri de Nostradamus".

Inri wandered over 27 countries, spreading his message. In 1980, Inri was expelled from the United States, from Venezuela, and from England. France sheltered him for nine months and even announced in Antenne 2: "Le Christ est revenu sur la terre" ("Christ is back on Earth"). On this occasion, Inri was invited to speak in the Grande École Polytechnique de Paris. Back in Brazil, on 28 February 1982, Inri performed what he called a "libertarian act." He broke into the cathedral in Belém in Pará state. Accused of profanation and vandalism by the clergy, he was sent to jail for fifteen days.

He has been detained by police more than forty times, owing to his statements and unusual way of dressing.

He is often invited to give lectures in many colleges and universities throughout Brazil, and he is usually well received by students.

== SOUST ==
SOUST, aka Suprema Ordem Universal da Santa Trindade (Acronym in Portuguese for "Supreme Universal Order of the Holy Trinity") refers to the residence of Álvaro Thais. Located on the outskirts of Brasília, DF, the property is protected by weapons, barbed wire, electric fence, dogs and an observation tower, where Álvaro lives with nine women, also with characterized garments. He has lived there since 2006, after spending two decades in Curitiba, in southern Brazil.

== See also ==
- Jerusalem syndrome
- List of messiah claimants
- List of people claimed to be Jesus
- Messiah complex
- Narcissism
