= Strong City =

Strong City may refer to places in the United States:

- Strong City, Kansas, a city
- Strong City, Oklahoma, a town
- Lord Our Righteousness Church, New Mexico, a religious community sometimes called Strong City, and the subject of the National Geographic documentary "Inside a Cult"

== See also ==
- Strong, Arkansas, a city
