= Louwrens =

Louwrens is a surname and a given name. Notable people with the name include:

Surname:

- Lo-handre Louwrens (born 1999), Namibian cricketer
- Michael Louwrens, paralympic athlete from South Africa
- Ryan Louwrens (born 1991), South African Australian rugby union player

Given name:

- Frans Johan Louwrens Ghijsels (1882–1947), Dutch architect and urban planner
- Louwrens Hanedoes (1822–1905), Dutch landscape painter
- Benjamin Louwrens Osler (1901–1962), rugby union footballer
- Louwrens Penning (1854–1927), Dutch novelist
- Louwrens Voorthuijzen (1898–1968), aka Lou de Palingboer, founder of a religious movement in the Netherlands
