= Odumosu =

Odumosu is a Nigerian surname. Notable people with the surname include:

- Abiola Odumosu (born 1963), Nigerian table tennis player
- Emmanuel Odumosu (1915–1988), known as Jesu Oyingbo, Nigerian religious sect leader
- David Odumosu (born 2001), Irish professional footballer
- Muizat Ajoke Odumosu (born 1987), Nigerian track and field athlete
