= Rhys Evans (disambiguation) =

Rhys Evans is an English footballer.

Rhys Evans may also refer to:

- Rhys Evans (rugby league) (born 1992), rugby league player
- Arise Evans (1607–1660), or Rhys Evans, Welsh prophet and fanatic

== See also ==
- Rhys Ifans (born 1967), actor
- Tim Rhys-Evans (born c. 1972), Welsh conductor
