= Vissarion =

Russian cult leader (born 1961)

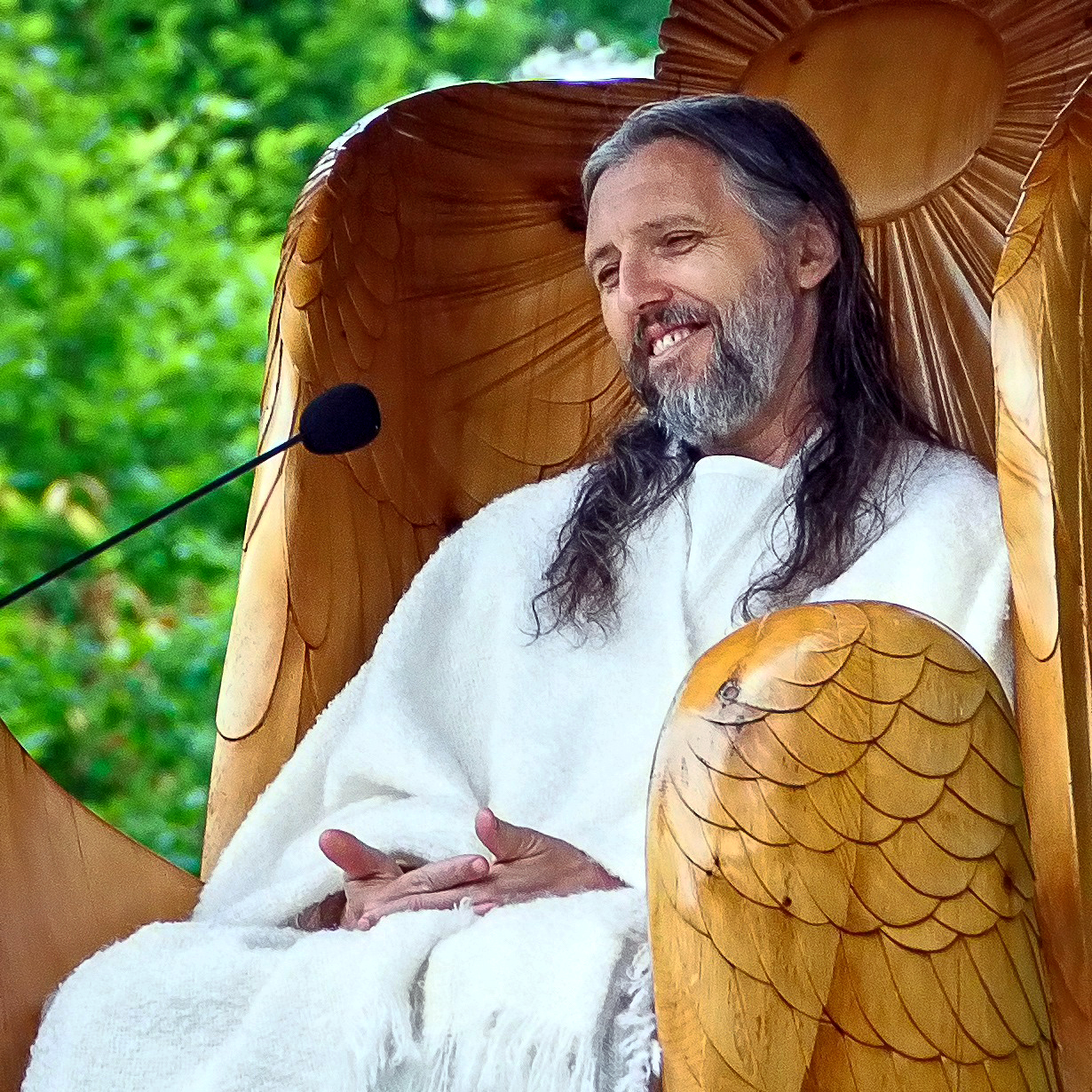
- Vissarion during the Sunday Teachings

Personal life
- Born: Sergei Anatolyevitch Torop; 14 January 1961 (age 65) Krasnodar, Russian SFSR, Soviet Union
- Parent(s): Anatoly Torop and Nadia Malashenko

Religious life
- Religion: Last Testamentism
- Church: Church of the Last Testament
- Profession: Spiritual Teacher

Sergei Anatolyevich Torop (Russian: Серге́й Анато́льевич То́роп; born 14 January 1961), better known as Vissarion (Russian: Виссарио́н), is a Russian religious leader, self-proclaimed reincarnation of Jesus, and founder of the Church of the Last Testament. He has been described by various organisations and media sources as a cult leader. His adopted name is the Russian form of the Greek name Βησσαρίων (Bessarion or Vissarion), meaning "wooded valley" or "ravine", while "life-giving" is a later devotional interpretation.

According to the followers of Sergei Torop and some of his own explanations, on 18 August 1990, at the age of 29, Sergey had a “spiritual awakening”. He gave his first public teaching after awakening in Minusinsk on 18 August 1991.

He founded the Church of the Last Testament (Церковь Последнего Завета Tserkov Poslednego Zaveta), also known as the Community of Unified Faith, with its head church located in the Siberian Taiga in the Minusinsk Basin east of Abakan, in the small settlement called Abode of Dawn (official name) or The Sun City (unofficial name) near Petropavlovka. Since then, the Christianity-based religious movement has amassed more than 10,000 followers around the world with around 4,000 living in the few settlements in Siberia near Vissarion.

As Vissarion, he teaches reincarnation, veganism, harmonious human relations, and predicting the end of the world.

Since 1991, on the basis of Vissarion's meetings, teachings and speeches, a multi-volume text called The Last Testament has been written, outlining a set of principles focused on self-improvement, self-governance and community.

In September 2020, Vissarion and two of his close students were arrested and taken away from homes by helicopters during an operation by Russia's Investigative Committee. The Russian authorities accused them of “creating a religious group whose activities may impose violence on citizens” — Vissarion's arrest may have been part of a broader campaign against non-conformist religious groups by the Russian government. The community continued operations. In 2025, he was sentenced to 12-years imprisonment.

== Biography ==
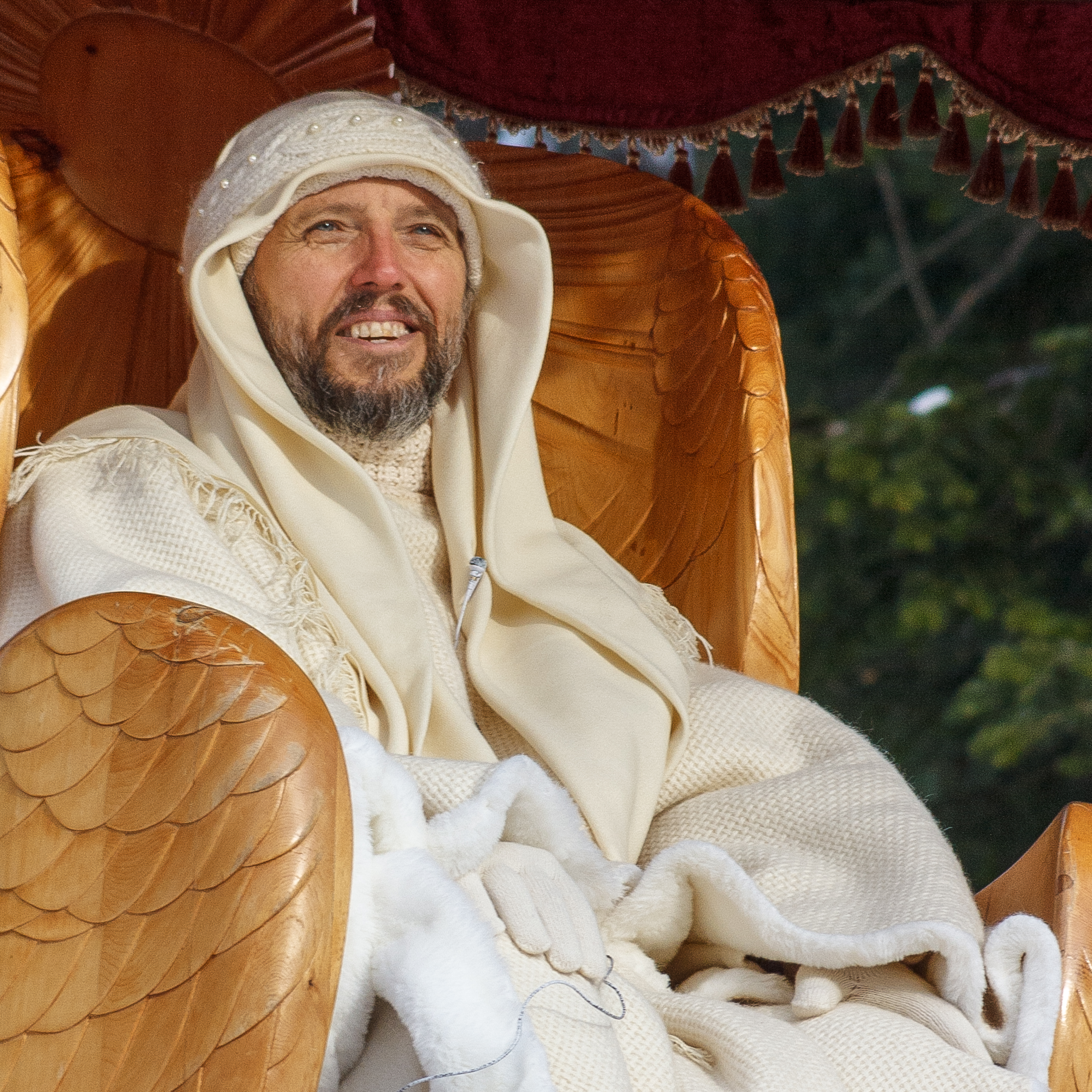
Vissarion

Sergei Anatolyevitch Torop was born in Krasnodar to Anatoly Torop and Nadezhda (née Malashenko). At 18, he began compulsory service by enlisting in the Red Army, becoming a sergeant working on building sites in Mongolia, followed by three years as a factory metal worker in Minusinsk, Siberia. In the town, he worked as a patrol officer before losing his job in 1989. Reported to have gained nine commendations during his five years of service, he was made redundant.

Torop claims that in 1990 he was "reborn" as Vissarion (meaning "he who gives new life"), claiming to be a returned Jesus Christ. In his system this does not make him God, but instead the word of God. His religious beliefs combine elements of the Russian Orthodox Church with Buddhism, apocalypticism, collectivism, and ecological values. Torop founded the Church of the Last Testament in Krasnoyarsk, Siberia in 1991 just before the fall of the USSR. He predicted the imminent end of the world with only his followers being saved.

His followers observe strict regulations, including abstaining from meat, smoking, drinking alcohol, swearing and the use of money. The aim of the group is to unite all religions on Earth. He replaced Christmas with a feast day on his birthday (14 January) and claimed to possess an ability to heal cancer and AIDS with a touch from his hand. The calendar runs from the day of Vissarion's birth in 1961; the biggest feast day (August 18) originates from his first sermon in 1991.

Tiberkul, the settlement in the Taiga, was established in 1994 on a territory of 2.5 square kilometres (620 acres), and expanded to several nearby villages, such as those of Petropavlovka and Cheremshanka, at ca. 53°52′N 94°05′E. It has some four thousand inhabitants, following ecological principles. The central settlement, also called The Town or The Mountain, has a three-tiered structure: the Town itself (Abode of Dawn), the Heavenly Abode, and the Temple Peak. The churches and houses are built from wood by hand, and most of the energy used originates from windmills or solar panels.

== Media coverage ==
Since 1992, biographer Vadim Redkin has published an annual volume detailing Vissarion's activities. Vissarion has attracted followers from Germany's esoteric subculture, and seven volumes of Vadim's account have been translated into German.

in 1993, Vissarion appeared at several moments in the documentary Bells from the Deep by Werner Herzog.

In May 2012, the Vice YouTube channel released "Cult Leader Thinks He's Jesus", containing a report by Rocco Castoro, a reporter for Vice in Petropavlovka, and his interview with Vissarion. This was the first time Vissarion had granted an interview in three years.

In 2018, the Japanese show Hyper Hardboiled Gourmet Report visited the City of the Sun, but did not interview the founder (Vissarion). It was able to interview multiple adherents, including children and a sub-founder.

== 2020 arrest ==
see also Freedom of religion in Russia

On 22 September 2020, Russian authorities arrested Vissarion on charges of running an illegal religious organization, possible physical harm to others, and extortion. He was apprehended by the FSB and Russian police, and taken to Novosibirsk central district court, along with two aides, Vadim Redkin and Vladimir Vedernikov. On 30 June 2025, he was convicted and sentenced to 12 years' imprisonment over the charges.

== Personal life ==
Torop repudiated his first wife and married a nineteen-year-old who had lived with him since she was seven. He has six children from the two marriages.

Vissarion has a younger half-sister, Irina. Although he has a biological mother of his own, Vissarion considers Mary, mother of Jesus as his mother.

== See also ==
- Christianity in Russia
- List of messiah claimants
- List of people claimed to be Jesus
- Messiah complex
