= Lu Sheng-yen =

Founder and spiritual leader of the True Buddha School

- 盧勝彥 (蓮生活佛)
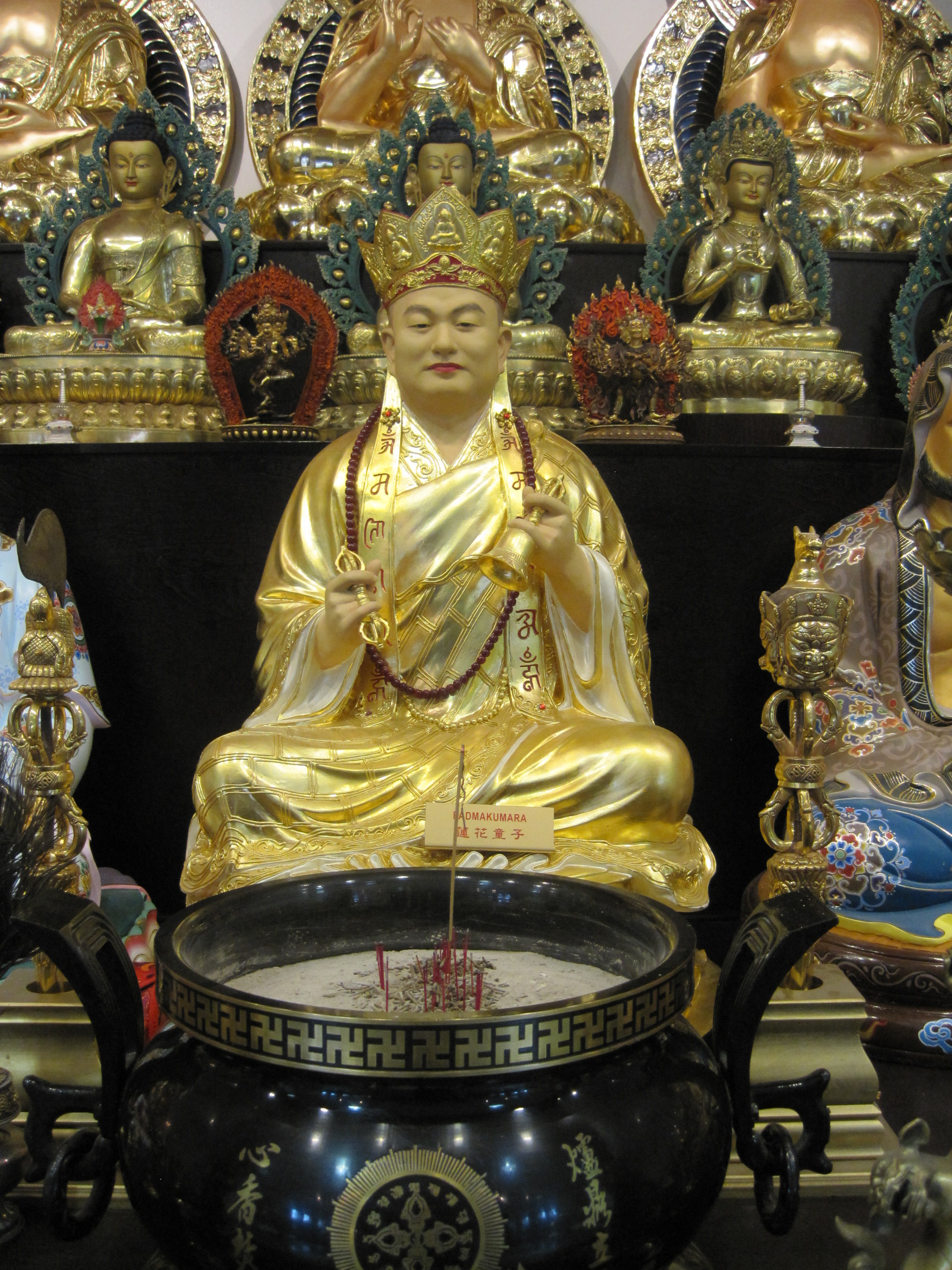
- Statue of Lu Sheng-Yan
- Title: Grand Master

Personal life
- Born: June 27, 1945 (age 80) (5th month, 18th day of the Lunar Calendar) Kagi, Tainan Prefecture, Taiwan (now Chiayi County)
- Spouse: Lu Li-hsiang (Lian Hsiang)
- Other names: Living Buddha Lian Sheng; Grand Master Lu; Huaguang Zizai Fo; White Lotus Padmakumara

Religious life
- Religion: Buddhism
- School: True Buddha School

Senior posting
- Based in: Redmond, Washington State
- Website: TBSN

Lu Sheng-Yen (Chinese: 盧勝彥; pinyin: Lú Shèngyàn; Pe̍h-ōe-jī: Lô Sèng-gān, born 27 June 1945), commonly referred to by followers as Grand Master Lu (師尊), is a Taiwanese-born American Buddhist teacher who is the founder and spiritual leader of the True Buddha School, a new religious movement with teachings from Buddhism, Confucianism and Taoism. Lu is known by the sect as Living Buddha Lian Sheng (蓮生活佛, Liansheng Huófó) and is revered by his disciples as a Living Buddha.

Lu’s sect claims to have more five million followers worldwide, of whom the majority hail from Taiwan, China, Macau, Singapore, Indonesia, Malaysia, and Hong Kong. Lu Sheng-Yen holds dual American and Taiwanese citizenship, and often travels between the two countries.

== Life ==
Lu Sheng-Yen was born in present-day Chiayi County, Taiwan in 1945. Lu was raised a Christian and attended a Protestant school. He graduated from Chung Cheng Institute of Technology with a degree in Survey Engineering. In his early twenties he was both a survey engineer for the Taiwan military and a Sunday School Bible teacher. Though his parents were not Christians, he had joined Kaohsiung New Presbyterian Church, in which he became an active member.

== Controversies ==
=== Differences between teachings and other Buddhist sects ===
In 2007, the Buddhist Federation of Malaysia, the Malaysian Buddhist Youth Association, the Malaysian Buddhist Dharma Promotion Association, the International Buddha's Light Association Malaysian Association, the Ceylon Buddhist Advancement Association, Buddhist Tzu Chi Merit Association and Malaysian Vajrayana issued a joint statement, criticizing the True Buddha Sect as a heretic Buddhist group, and questioned Lu Shengyan´s claim to be a Buddha and the supreme power of Dharma. They argue that these claims are misleading, and his personal behavior is not in line with the Buddhist system.

=== Allegations of money-making fraud ===
In 2007, seven Buddhist groups in Malaysia criticized Shengyan Lu's gatherings for conducting monetary transactions in a statement. For example, the Buddhist hat worn by Shengyan Lu was priced at 300,000 USD, and the cassock worn by Mr. Lu was priced at 100,000 USD. Moreover, the proceeds from the auction were handed over to Lu Shengyan himself. In 2012, in New Taipei City Banqiao District, a church leader from the True Buddhist Sect promised to help believers invest in stocks and guaranteed that the investment would be profitable. Lee, accused of violating Banking Law.

=== Collective cash donation to then-Governor Gary Locke ===
Lu made headlines during an investigation by the Washington State Public Disclosure Commission, prompted by media reporting, into a collective cash donation to then-Governor Gary Locke after a speaking engagement at the Ling Shen Ching Tze Temple. Lu hoped Locke might eventually run for the White House. Locke was cleared of any wrongdoing by the commission in 1998. Further, this did not affect Locke in his pursuit for confirmation as U.S. Secretary of Commerce.

=== Criticism ===
In 2007, the Buddhist Federation of Malaysia, the Malaysian Buddhist Youth Association, the Malaysian Buddhist Dharma Promotion Association, the International Buddha's Light Association Malaysian Association, the Ceylon Buddhist Advancement Association, Buddhist Tzu Chi Merit Association and Malaysian Vajrayana Buddhist Association issued a joint statement, criticizing the True Buddha Sect as a Buddhist heretic rather than orthodox Buddhism, and stating their view that Lu Sheng-yen claimed to be Buddha and claimed the supreme power of Dharma.

== See also ==
- List of Buddha claimants
