= List of people claimed to be Jesus =

This is a partial list of notable people (Note: Notability is established with a Wikipedia article, either as a biographical article about the person who claimed to be Jesus, or an article about their followers) who have been continuously claimed, either by themselves or by their followers, to be the reincarnation or incarnation of Jesus, or the Second Coming of Christ.

== 17th century ==
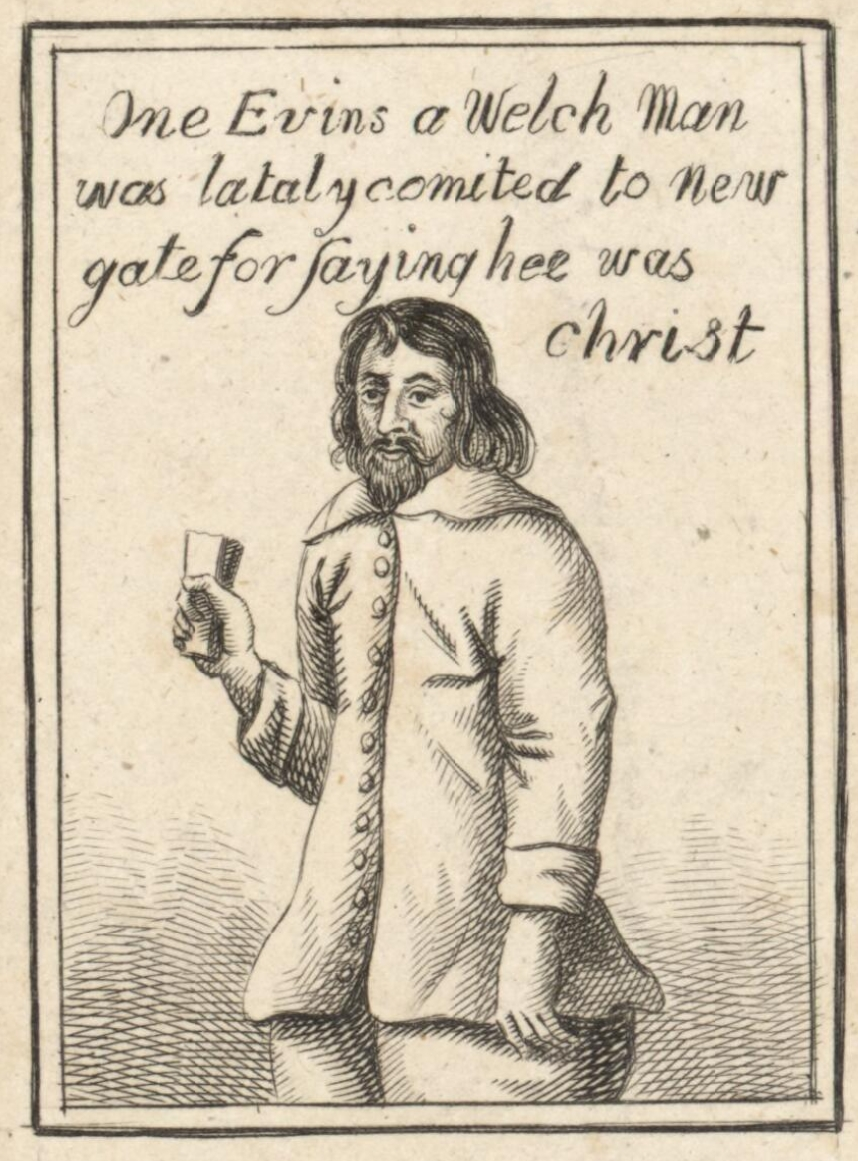
Portrait of the Welsh prophet, Rhys 'Arise' Evans.

- Rhys Evans, (1607 – c.1660) who later renamed himself 'Arise Evans' was a Welsh prophet who travelled to London to spread his premonitions. He was arrested and imprisoned around 1650 at Newgate Prison for impersonating Christ.

== 18th century ==
- Kondratiy Selivanov (c. 1730s–1832), the founder and leader of the Skoptsy sect in the Russian Empire.
- Ann Lee (1736–1784), the founder and leader of the Shakers. Lee's followers referred to her as "Mother", believing that she was the female incarnation of Christ on Earth.

== 19th century ==
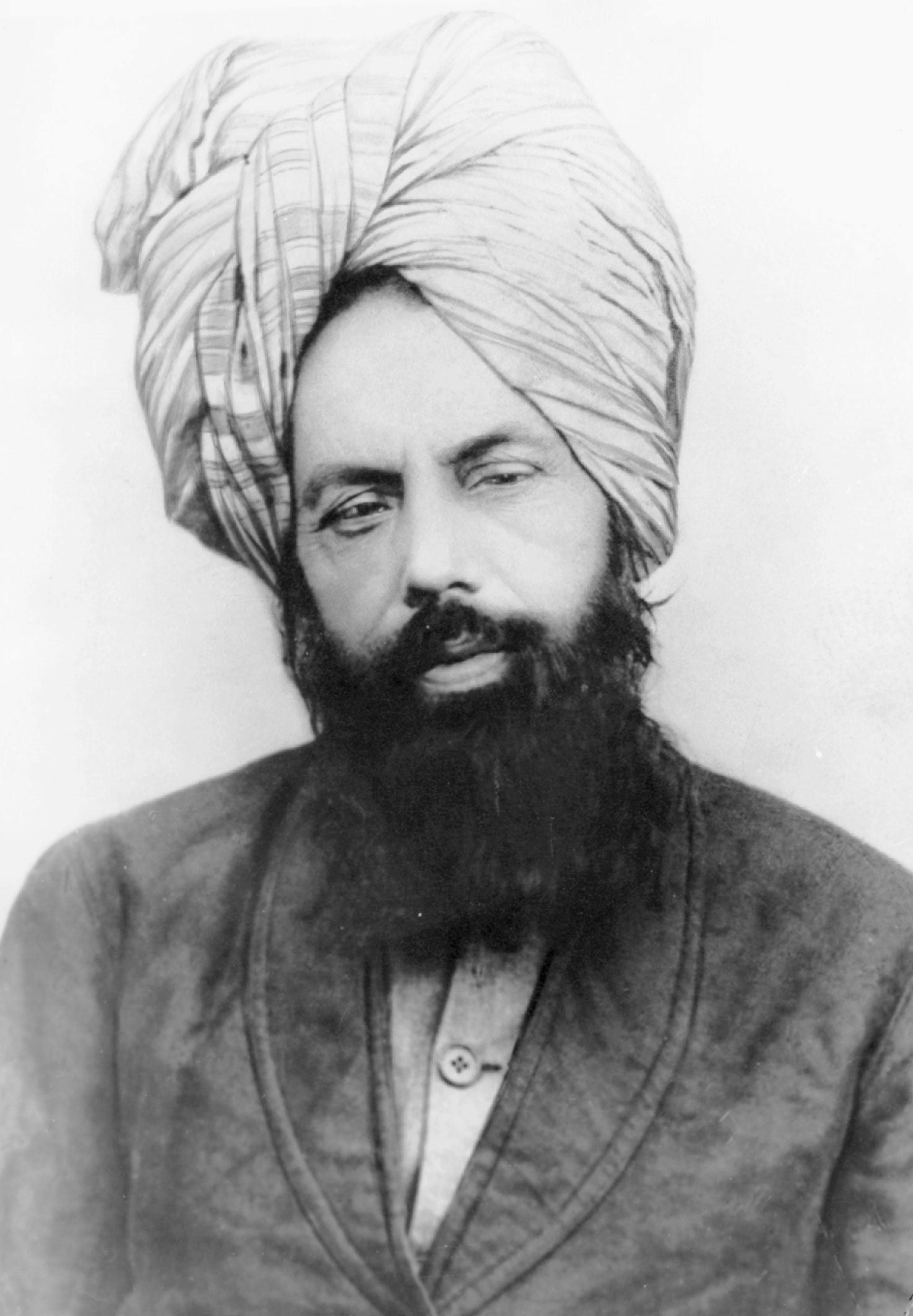
Mirza Ghulam Ahmad

- John Nichols Thom (1799–1838), a Cornish merchant and politician who claimed to be the "saviour of the world" and the reincarnation of Jesus Christ in 1834. He was killed during a confrontation with government soldiers at the Battle of Bossenden Wood on 31 May 1838 near Hernhill, Kent.
- William Price (1800–1893), a Welsh Neo-Druid, who claimed that two of his sons were Jesus.
- Arnold Potter (1804–1872), Schismatic Latter Day Saint leader; he claimed the spirit of Jesus Christ entered into his body and he became "Potter Christ" Son of the living God. He died in an attempt to "ascend into heaven" by jumping off a cliff. His body was later retrieved and buried by his followers.
- Baháʼu'lláh (1817–1892), born Shiite, adopted Bábism later in 1844; he claimed to be the prophesied fulfillment and Promised One of major religions including Hinduism, Judaism, Zoroastrianism, Buddhism, Christianity and Islam. He founded the Baháʼí Faith in 1863. The Baháʼís believe that the fulfillment of the prophecies of the Second Coming of Jesus, as well as the prophecies of the 5th Buddha Maitreya and many other religious prophecies, were begun by the Báb in 1844 and then by Bahá'u'lláh. They commonly compare the fulfillment of Christian prophecies to Jesus' fulfillment of Jewish prophecies, where in both cases people were expecting the literal fulfillment of apocalyptic statements.
- William W. Davies (1833–1906), leader of a Latter Day Saint schismatic group called the Kingdom of Heaven located in Walla Walla, Washington from 1867 to 1881. He taught his followers that he was the archangel Michael, who had previously lived as the biblical Adam, Abraham, and David. When his son Arthur was born on 11 February 1868, Davies declared that the infant was the reincarnated Jesus Christ. When Davies's second son, David, was born in 1869, he was declared to be God the Father.
- Mirza Ghulam Ahmad of Qadian, India (1835–1908), claimed to be the awaited Mahdi as well as the Second Coming and likeness of Jesus, the promised Messiah at the end of time. He claimed to be Jesus in the metaphorical sense; in character. He founded the Ahmadiyya Movement in 1889, envisioning it to be the rejuvenation of Islam, and claimed to be commissioned by God for the reformation of humankind.
- Cyrus Teed (1839–1908), American physician, claimed to be the incarnation of Jesus Christ and to have obtained knowledge regarding the Hollow Earth theory, presenting a cosmological model having the Earth as an inverted sphere and the remaining universe located within it.
- Carl Browne (1849–1914), American activist and leader of the Coxey's Army protest movement, claimed to be the partial reincarnation of Jesus.

== 20th century ==
- John Hugh Smyth-Pigott (1852–1927). Around 1890 Smyth-Pigott started leading meetings of the Agapemonite community and recruited 50 young female followers to supplement its aging population. He took Ruth Anne Preece as his second wife and she had three children named Glory, Power and Hallelujah. Smyth-Pigott died in 1927 and the sect gradually declined until the last member, sister Ruth, died in 1956. Her funeral in 1956 was the only time when outsiders were admitted to the chapel.
- Manuel Herrick (1876–1952). American politician who saw himself as the reincarnation of Jesus Christ, thus gaining the nickname "Okie Jesus Congressman."

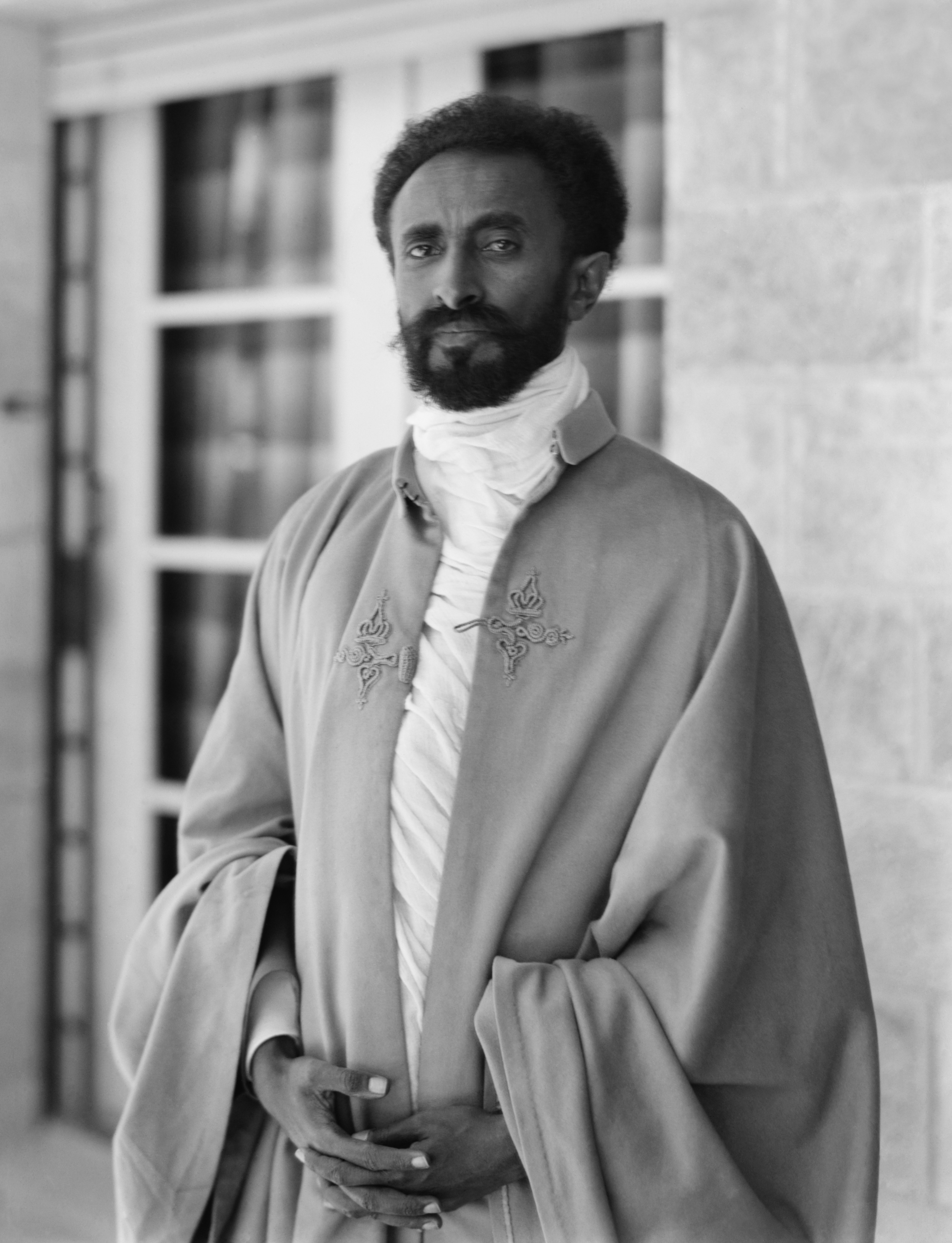
Haile Selassie I

- Haile Selassie I (1892–1975) did not claim to be Jesus and disapproved of claims that he was Jesus, but the Rastafari movement, which emerged in Jamaica during the 1930s, believes he is the Second Coming. He embodied this when he became Emperor of Ethiopia in 1930, perceived as confirmation of the return of the Messiah in the prophetic Book of Revelation 5:5 in the New Testament, who is also expected to return a second time to initiate the apocalyptic day of judgment. He is also called Jah Ras Tafari, and is often considered to be alive by Rastafari movement members.
- Hilario Moncado (1898–1956), a Filipino political activist and "mystic". He was the founder and leader of the Filipino Crusaders World Army (formerly the Filipino Federation of America), a religious and patriotic group in the Philippines colloquially known as the "Moncadistas". He claimed to be a reincarnation of Christ through José Rizal (a National Hero of the Philippines).
- Ernest Norman (1904–1971), an American electrical engineer who co-founded the Unarius Academy of Science in 1954, was allegedly Jesus in a past life and his earthly incarnation was as an archangel named Raphael. He claimed to be the reincarnation of other notable figures including Confucius, Mona Lisa, Benjamin Franklin, Socrates, Queen Elizabeth I, and Tsar Peter I the Great.

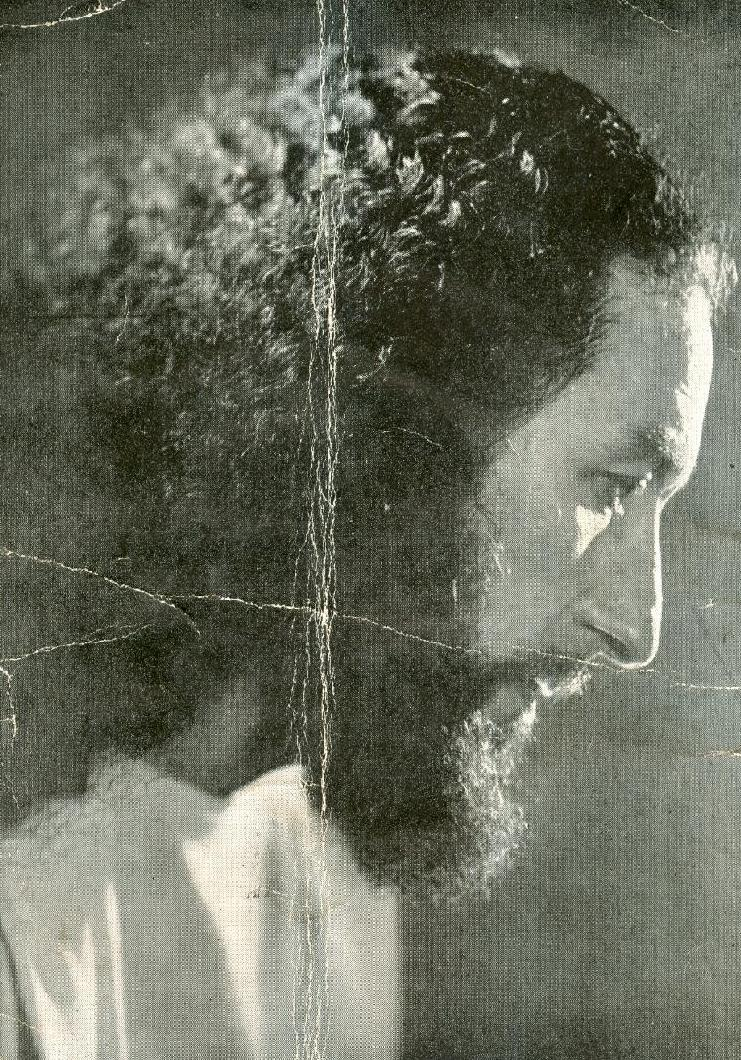
Krishna Venta

- Krishna Venta (1911–1958), born Francis Herman Pencovic in San Francisco, founded the WKFL (Wisdom, Knowledge, Faith and Love) Fountain of the World cult in Simi Valley, California in the late 1940s. In 1948 he stated that he was Christ, the new messiah and claimed to have led a convoy of rocket ships to Earth from the extinct planet Neophrates. He died on 10 December 1958, after being suicide-bombed by two disgruntled former followers who accused Venta of mishandling cult funds and having been intimate with their wives.
- Jesu Oyingbo (1915–1988), a Nigerian man who proclaimed himself to be Jesus Christ returned.
- Ahn Sahng-hong (1918–1985), a South Korean who founded the World Mission Society Church of God in 1964, who recognize him as the Second Coming of Jesus. The World Mission Society Church of God teach that Zahng Gil-jah is "God the Mother", who they explain is referred to in the Bible as the New Jerusalem Mother (Galatians 4:26), and that Ahn Sahng-Hong is God the Father.

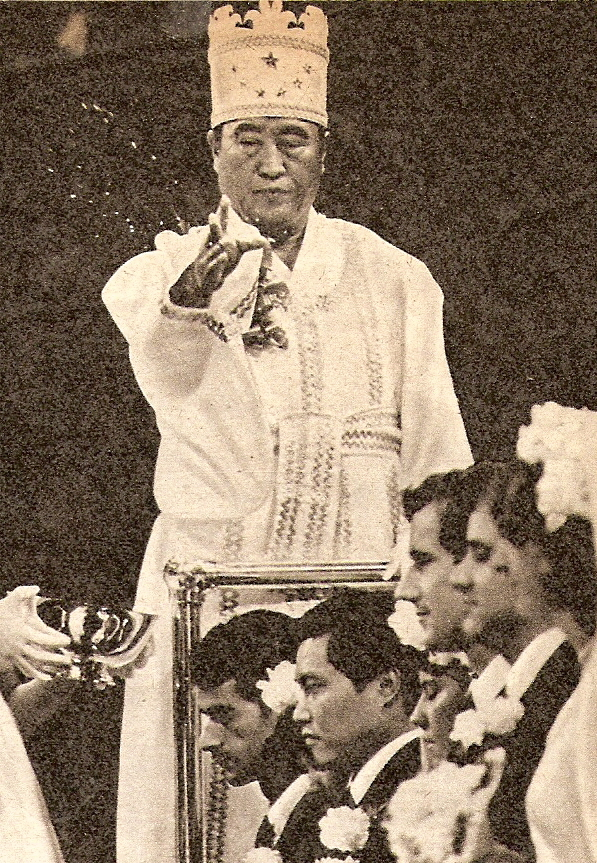
Sun Myung Moon

- Sun Myung Moon (1920–2012), believed by members of the Unification Church to be the Messiah and the Second Coming of Christ, fulfilling Jesus' unfinished mission. Church members ("Unificationists") consider Sun Myung Moon and his wife, Hak Ja Han, to be the True Parents of humankind as the restored Adam and Eve.
- Anne Hamilton-Byrne (1921–2019) of The Family, born Evelyn Grace Victoria Edwards.
- Jim Jones (1931–1978), founder of Peoples Temple, which started off as an offshoot of a mainstream Protestant sect before becoming a personality cult as time went on. In the 1970s he claimed to be the reincarnation of Jesus, Akhenaten, the Buddha, Vladimir Lenin and Father Divine. He organized a mass murder suicide at Jonestown, Guyana on 18 November 1978. He shot himself after the murders were done.
- Marshall Applewhite (1931–1997), an American who posted a Usenet message declaring, "I, Jesus—Son of God—acknowledge on this date of September 25/26, 1995: ..." Applewhite and his Heaven's Gate religious group committed mass suicide on 26 March 1997, to rendezvous with what they thought was a spaceship hiding behind Comet Hale–Bopp.
- Charles Manson (1934–2017), American criminal, cult leader, and songwriter.
- Yahweh ben Yahweh (1935–2007), born as Hulon Mitchell Jr., a black nationalist and separatist who created the Nation of Yahweh in 1979 in Liberty City, Florida. His self-proclaimed name means "God, Son of God". He could have only been deeming himself to be "son of God", not God, but many of his followers clearly deem him to be God Incarnate. In 1992, he was convicted of conspiracy to commit murder and sentenced to 18 years in prison.
- Laszlo Toth (1938–2012), Hungarian-born Australian who claimed he was Jesus Christ as he vandalized Michelangelo's Pietà with a geologist's hammer in 1972.
- Ji Sanbao (1939–1997), the founder and first leader of the Mentuhui, a Chinese Christian doomsday sect and secret society. In 1985, Ji proclaimed himself the Son of God and the "Three-Redemptive Christ" (referring to the redemption of Noah, the redemption of Lot, and the redemption of Ji Sanbao).
- Wayne Bent (b. 1941), also known as Michael Travesser of the Lord Our Righteousness Church. He claims: "I am the embodiment of God. I am divinity and humanity combined." He was convicted on 15 December 2008, of one count of criminal sexual contact of a minor and two counts of contributing to the delinquency of a minor in 2008.
- Ariffin Mohammed (1943–2016), also known as "Ayah Pin", the founder of the banned Sky Kingdom in Malaysia in 1975. He claimed to have direct contact with the heavens and is believed by his followers to have been the incarnation of Jesus, as well as Shiva, and the Buddha, and Muhammad.
- Mitsuo Matayoshi (1944–2018) was a conservative Japanese politician, who in 1997 established the World Economic Community Party based on his conviction that he is God and Christ, renaming himself Iesu Matayoshi. According to his program he will do the Last Judgment as Christ but within the current political system.
- Tony Quinn (b. 1944), owned Yoga communes in 1970s Ireland where an orphan girl responsible for younger siblings endured a 40-day water-fast and ceased menstruation. He later created Educo which promoted the Ten percent of the brain myth and was rubbished by Professors of Psychology and Psychiatry in Ireland. It was found by the Eastern Caribbean Supreme Court that his allocation of shares in International Natural Energy was affirmed by a "clumsy forgery". An ex-follower sued Quinn for "assault and battery; allegedly obtaining money by false pretences; alleged fraudulent misrepresentation, intentional or careless infliction of mental suffering and suborning" in 2010.
- Hogen Fukunaga (b. 1945) founded Ho No Hana Sanpogyo, often called the "foot reading cult", in Japan in 1987 after an alleged spiritual event where he claimed to have realized he was the reincarnation of Jesus Christ and Gautama Buddha.
- José Luis de Jesús (1946–2013), Puerto Rican founder, leader and organizer of Growing in Grace based in Miami, Florida, who claimed that the resurrected Christ "integrated himself within me" in 2007.
- Inri Cristo (b. 1948), a Brazilian who claims to be the second Jesus reincarnated in 1969. Brasília is considered by Inri Cristo and his disciples as the New Jerusalem of the Apocalypse.
- Thomas Harrison Provenzano (1949–2000), an American convicted murderer who was possibly mentally ill. He compared his execution with Jesus Christ's crucifixion.
- Hasan Mezarcı (b. 1954) is a former politician and member of the Grand National Assembly of Turkey (1991–1995) who was expelled from the Welfare Party and imprisoned for his extreme view against secularism. He claimed to be Isa after his imprisonment.
- Shoko Asahara (1955–2018) founded the terrorist Japanese religious group Aum Shinrikyo in 1984. He declared himself Christ, Japan's only fully enlightened master and the Lamb of God. His purported mission was to take upon himself the sins of the world. He outlined a doomsday prophecy, which included a Third World War, and described a final conflict culminating in a nuclear Armageddon, borrowing the term from the Book of Revelation 16:16. Humanity would end, except for the elite few who joined Aum. The group gained international notoriety on 20 March 1995, when it carried out the sarin gas attack on the Tokyo subway. He was sentenced to death, and was executed on 6 July 2018.
- David Koresh (1959–1993), leader of religious cult Branch Davidians
- Marina Tsvigun (b. 1960), or Maria Devi Christos, is the leader of the "Great White Brotherhood". In 1990 she met Yuri Krivonogov, the Great White Brotherhood founder, who recognized Marina as a new messiah and later married her, assuming in the sect the role of John the Baptist, subordinate to Tsvigun.
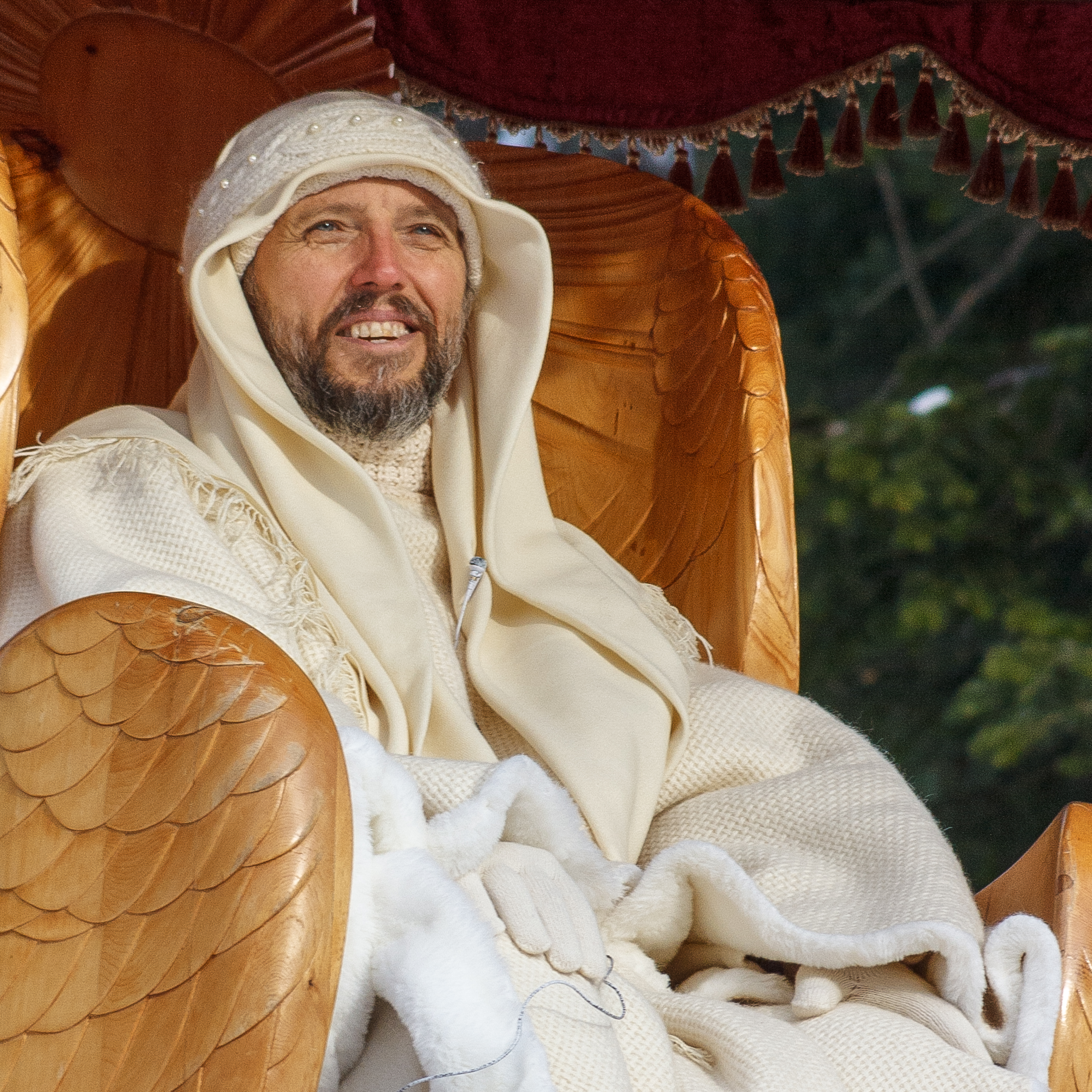
- Vissarion
  Sergey Torop (b. 1961), a Russian former traffic officer who claims to be "reborn" as Vissarion, Jesus Christ returned, which makes him not "God" but the "Word of God". Also known as "Jesus of Siberia," Torop has an appearance similar to depictions of Jesus. He dresses in all white flowing robes and has long brown hair and a beard. Before claiming to be the Vissarion, Torop worked as a traffic policeman until he was fired in 1990. He founded the Church of the Last Testament and the spiritual community Ecopolis Tiberkul in Southern Siberia in 1990. The Church of the Last Testament has been described as being a mixture of beliefs from the Russian Orthodox Church, Buddhism, apocalypticism, collectivism, and with ecological values. The church currently resides on the largest religious reservation in the world in Siberian Taiga.
- Yang Xiangbin (b. 1973), a woman referred to as "Lightning Deng" and "the female Christ" in the literature of Eastern Lightning, a Chinese Christian new religious movement. Eastern Lightning claims that Jesus has returned to earth as a Chinese woman, citing the Gospel of Matthew 24:27: "For as the lightning cometh out of the east, and shineth even unto the west; so shall also the coming of the Son of man be". Eastern Lightning is banned in the People's Republic of China due to several prolific violent crimes committed by its members; Chinese and international news media have in turn described the group as a cult.
- Alan Birnbaum (b. 1946 or 1947), the founder of the Temple of the True Inner Light, a New York City-based psychedelic church that follows an eclectic Christian revisionist religion and employs the psychedelic drug dipropyltryptamine (DPT) as its eucharist. The group believes psychedelics to be God and is said to believe that Birnbaum is a reincarnation of Jesus Christ.
- Daniel Rakowitz (b. 1960), also known as the "Butcher of Tompkins Square", a murderer and cannibal in New York City who in 1989 killed his roommate Monika Beerle, ate parts of her, and then fed her to homeless people in Tompkins Square Park. He variously claimed to be Jesus Christ or God, the Antichrist, and the "God of marijuana" and tried to start his own religion around cannabis called the "Church of 966".

== 21st century ==
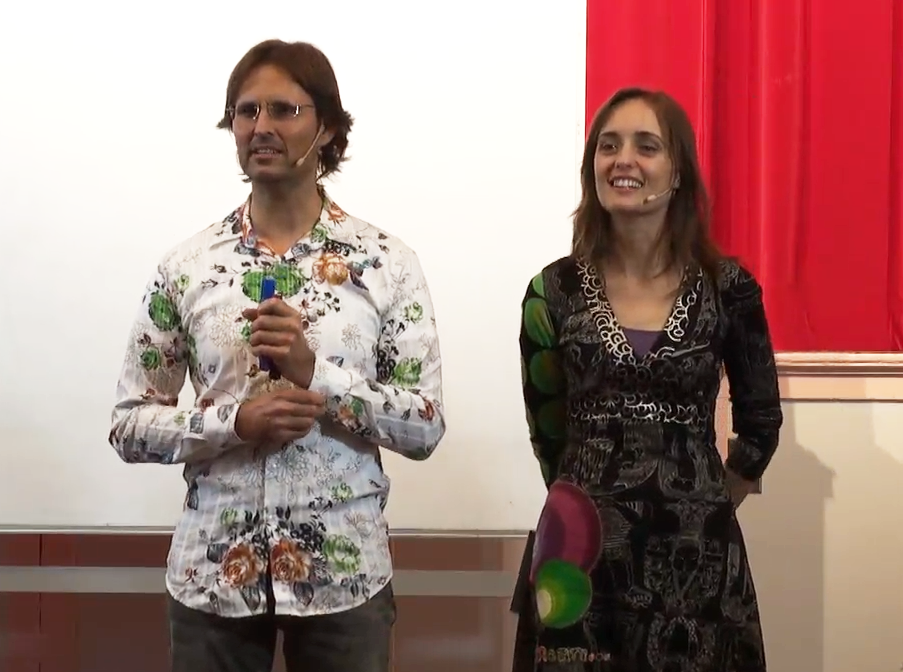
Alan John Miller and Mary Luck (Divine Truth)

- Alvaro Thais (b. 1948) is a Brazilian esoteric guru who made claims to be the second coming of Jesus in 1979, after allegedly having a revelation in a seclusion during some days in Santiago, Chile. Following the supposed epiphany, he changed his name to "Inri Cristo" (en: Inri Christ) and began to preach his doctrine, having traveled to several countries in Latin America and Europe. He also founded the institution Suprema Ordem Universal da Santíssima Trindade (en: Supreme Universal Order of the Holy Trinity) on February 28, 1982, after invading the Metropolitan Cathedral of Belém, where he attacked the vicar and broke images. When arrested, he claimed that he was practicing the "libertarian act". After spending fifteen days in the São José Liberto Prison, Inri was released and returned to Curitiba.
- Apollo Quiboloy (b. 1950) is the founder and leader of a Philippines-based Restorationist church, the Kingdom of Jesus Christ, The Name Above Every Name, Inc. He has made claims that he is the "Appointed Son of God". He is currently wanted by the FBI for sex trafficking, among others.
- Alan John Miller (b. 1962), more commonly known as A.J. Miller, a former Jehovah's Witness Elder and current leader of the Australia-based Divine Truth movement. Miller claims to be Jesus Christ reincarnated with others in the 20th century to spread messages that he calls the "Divine Truth". He delivers these messages in seminars and various forms of media along with his current partner Mary Suzanne Luck, who identifies herself as the returned Mary Magdalene.
- Delores Kane (b. 1965) is a former MI5 officer and whistleblower who, in the summer of 2007, proclaimed herself to be the Messiah. She has released a series of videos on YouTube claiming to be Jesus, although she has not built up any noticeable following since her claims.
- Maurice Clemmons (1972–2009), an American felon responsible for the 2009 murder of four police officers in Washington state, referred to himself in May 2009 as Jesus.
- Amy Carlson (1975–2021), leader of the religious group Love Has Won, said she was a deity known as Mother God. She claimed she was Mother Earth, Gaia, Cleopatra, Jesus, Joan of Arc, Harriet Tubman, and Marilyn Monroe; she claimed to have full memory of her lives, including being hanged on the cross as Jesus.
- Oscar Ramiro Ortega-Hernandez (b. 1990). In November 2011, he fired nine shots with a Romanian Cugir SA semi-automatic rifle at the White House in Washington D.C., believing himself to be Jesus Christ sent to kill U.S. President Barack Obama, whom he believed to be the antichrist.
- Todd Kincannon (b. 1981), former head of the South Carolina Republican Party, was arrested in 2018 for killing and mutilating his mother's dog. He claimed to police he was the Second Coming of Jesus Christ and that God had told him to do it, because “every 1,000 years there needs to be a sacrifice and blood must be spilt."
- Jey Rence Quilario (b. 2000), also known as Senior Agila and the president of the Socorro Bayanihan Services. Ex-members claimed that Quilario allegedly believed himself to be God, the reincarnation of the Santo Niño and the Messiah.
- Jeff Divine aka Jeff Ayan, co-founder of Twin Flames Universe, has claimed that historical depictions of Jesus actually depict himself as "the second coming".

== See also ==
- Cult of personality
- Doomsday cult
- God complex
- Hong Xiuquan – claimed to be Jesus' little brother
- Jerusalem syndrome
- Jewish Messiah claimants
- List of avatar claimants
- List of Buddha claimants
- List of founders of religious traditions
- List of Mahdi claimants
- List of messiah claimants
- List of people who have been considered deities
- Messiah complex
- Messianism
- Religious delusion
- Unfulfilled Christian religious predictions
