= Divine Truth =

Christian new religious movement

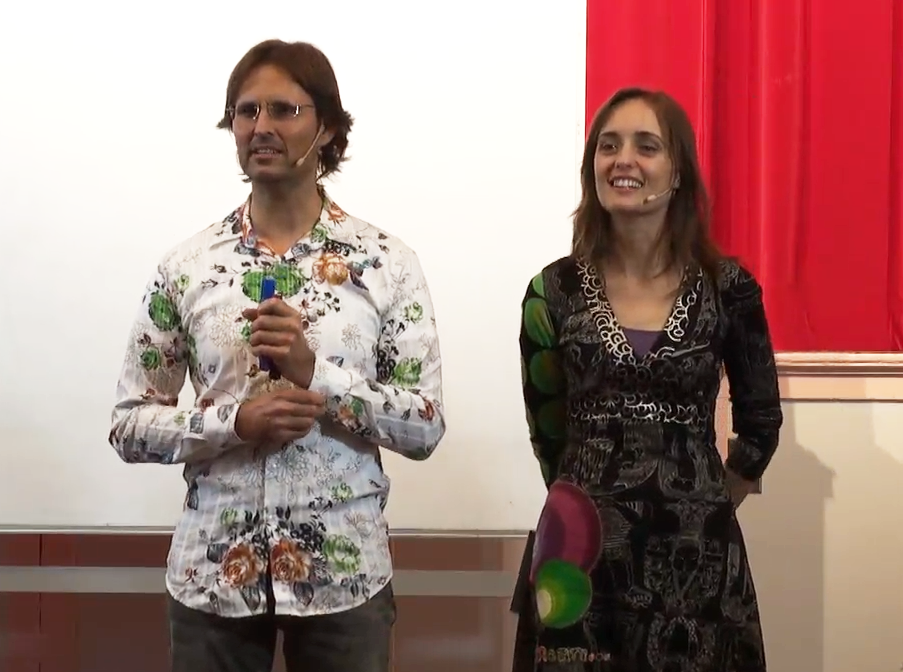
- Alan John Miller and Mary Luck presenting a Divine Truth seminar in 2013
- Classification: Christian new religious movement
- Region: Australia
- Founder: Alan John Miller (known as "AJ" and "Jesus")
- Origin: 2007; Wilkesdale, Queensland, Australia
- Official website: www.divinetruth.com blog.godsway.net

Divine Truth is a controversial new religious movement based in Queensland, Australia, taught by Alan John Miller, also known as A.J., who claims to be the reincarnation of Jesus of Nazareth, and his partner, Mary Suzanne Luck, who claims to be the reincarnation of Mary Magdalene. The couple describe Divine Truth as non-religious. Critics accuse the couple of running a cult.

Alan John Miller was born on March 10, 1963, in Loxton, South Australia, Australia, and Mary Suzanne Luck was born on January 2, 1979, in Brisbane, Queensland, Australia. Alan and Mary both claim that prior to their current lives on Earth, they each have lived only a single life on Earth, which began around the beginning of the 1st century AD and then continued for 1900+ years in the spirit world (or other dimensional spaces) after their deaths on Earth in the 1st century. They state that during their existence in the spirit world, they continued to grow and learn, and were able to discover a process by which they could return to Earth. Miller calls the return process “reincarnation”, although his conception differs substantially from most other philosophies of reincarnation.

Miller claims that Divine Truth is God’s Truth, which is the absolute truth about the universe and everything inside of it, from the perspective of God. He clearly defines Divine Truth as non-religious, saying "It is always logical, it is always scientific in its nature, it is always mathematical in its nature. It is always based in reality, but not human reality, it's the reality of how God sees everything." Miller teaches that he has discovered it through forming a personal relationship with God, and he teaches that Divine Truth can be discovered by any person through the same process. Divine Truth teachings include information about God and God’s nature, the nature of the human soul, its growth and potentials, how to have a relationship with God, what is loving from God’s perspective, how to become a more loving individual, life after death, spirits and the spirit world, and the laws that govern the operation of the universe.

Several of Miller's teachings are very similar to teachings found in True Gospel Revealed Anew by Jesus (4 vols.) (1940-1972), a collection of material which had been dictated (between 1914-1922) via a form of automatic writing through lawyer and medium James Edward Padgett (August 25, 1852 - March 17, 1923). This material allegedly had been communicated directly to Padgett by Jesus and by several other discarnate spirits who were also highly spiritually advanced. The Prayer for Divine Love, on the Divine Truth website, was originally dictated to Padgett on December 2, 1916. Miller claims that since he is Jesus, he gave most of the information contained within the Padgett messages to James Padgett.

== Divine Truth teachings ==
=== Relationship with God ===
The primary focus of Divine Truth teachings describe how to form a personal relationship with God, since God is personally interested in all of His or Her Children. It teaches that it is possible to form this relationship directly with God, and the relationship does not require intermediaries, such as Jesus or priests. It is claimed that this relationship will become the source of all truth, love, happiness, and information about the universe and how it operates.

Relationship with God is achieved by engaging in three principles – firstly developing humility, then being open to praying for Divine (God’s) Truth, and most importantly praying for Divine (God’s) Love to enter our soul. Humility is defined as a passionate and sincere longing and desire to experience all emotions, whether those emotions are painful or pleasurable. Prayer for God’s Truth is defined as a passionate desire for universal and personal truth to be a part of one's life, and which causes a person to seek truth daily. Prayer for God’s Love is defined as a sincere emotional longing towards God for God’s Love. Prayer is not an intellectual process.

The focus on humility derives from the teaching that human souls are emotional, and God’s Soul is emotional, and therefore a true relationship with God can be formed only through an emotional bond with God, and not a thought-based connection. There is a focus on the cathartic release of emotions in the teachings, since emotional “errors” inside of people, which are emotions that are not in harmony with love, block the flow of God’s Love into the human soul. Therefore these painful emotions need to be experienced in order for one to continue to receive God’s Love.

Miller teaches that a personal relationship with God can lead to a rapid development in love, through the reception of God’s Love, and that after the experience of all emotional errors, God’s Love can transform the human soul into a condition of at-onement with God, or being “Christed”. He teaches that this condition is possible for any person, and that it is the state that Jesus (whom he claims to be) attained in the first century. He also teaches that millions of people have reached this state in the spirit world after they died on Earth. Divine Truth teachings also focus on how to develop in love through an understanding of ethics and morality, and the respect of others’ free will. He teaches that free will is a primary gift from God, and must be used responsibly, ethically and morally if a person desires to maintain a relationship with God.

The principles of Divine Truth have been presented since 2007. In 2012, the couple created the Divine Truth YouTube channel. In a seven-minute interview which aired on A Current Affair, Miller explained that Divine Truth is God's truth and is the "absolute truth of the universe".

== Leadership ==
On the British magazine-programme This Morning on 15 July 2015, A. J. Miller was asked why he has now decided to publicly claim to be Jesus, he said that as soon as he realised who he was, he felt he had to be honest about his identity (which was over 10 years ago), but that he has always shared Divine Truth or God’s Truth with others throughout his life. In an interview with The Sydney Morning Herald, Miller clarifies, ”When I claim I'm Jesus, most people automatically assume that means I'm claiming a lot of things. They assume it means I'm claiming I'm God, and I'm not. They assume it means that I'm claiming that everyone should listen to me, and I'm not. In fact, I tell people they need to always analyse things through their own experience." When asked to perform miracles to prove that he is Jesus, A. J. explains that in the first century he was only able to perform miracles once he became "at-one" with God, whereby God could work through him. He goes on to say, that at present, he is not yet at that stage of development, but when he becomes at-one with God he feels both he and Mary will do so, which they see as just the reality of being at-one with God, rather than miracles.

Miller explains that since the age of two, he has had memories of his entire 2000 years of existence. He has found it psychologically difficult to assimilate these memories into his current life, hoping for some time that they were not evidence of his identity, knowing people would respond negatively. Miller finally started accepting he was Jesus at the age of 40.

When asked by Eamonn Holmes what his message to the world is, Miller responded that “The primary message is that there are two forms of love. There is the love that comes out of the individual, given to another, and there’s God’s Love that can enter the individual. God’s love has the power to transform not only the individual into becoming a more loving person, but also transform the world. What we’re trying to encourage people to do is to engage this process with God, of receiving Love from God, then noticing the changes that occur inside of themselves and then sharing that love with others. So that’s our primary message.” When asked if he talks to God, the Father, does he communicate with the Father, Miller responded by saying, “Yes, but not in the manner that most people believe, the language of God is love, and the communications with God have to flow through the connection with love.”

== Earth changes prediction ==
A. J. Miller has stated that what others claim are predictions are just his personal opinions and feelings at that point in time and not to be taken as definite predictions. One of these opinions was that "100-foot tidal waves" would turn Kingaroy into beachfront property. His feeling at the time was that global Earth changes would occur between 2011 and 2013. Miller describes some of these events as similar to events in the movie 2012. Miller stated in 2011: "There's the movie 2012 right? Everyone I suggest you see it, everyone. A lot of the events portrayed in the movie are kind of similar to the events that will be occurring.

Miller has also stated similar feelings such as that a 100 m tsunami might hit Australia, that a new continent would rise up next to Hawaii, that devastating earthquakes will occur, that some countries will disappear completely while other countries will change completely.

== See also ==
- List of messiah claimants
- Messiah complex
