= Jesu Oyingbo =

Nigerian religious leader

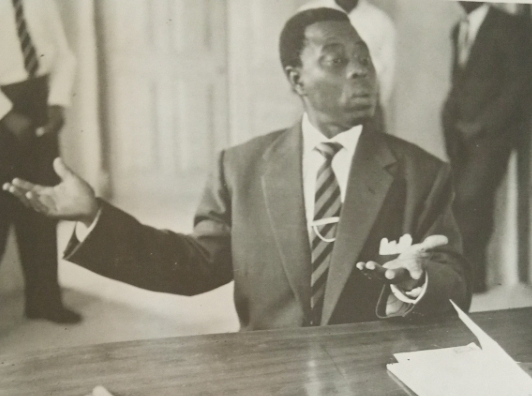
Jesu Oyingbo

Emmanuel Olufunmilayo Odumosu (1915–1988) known predominantly by his sobriquet Jesu Oyingbo which means “Jesus of Oyingbo” was a religious sect leader who claimed he was Jesus Christ returned. He founded the Universal College of Regeneration in Lagos. A self-proclaimed messiah, his personal beliefs included liberal sexual rights and capital accumulation. Sect members worked in various businesses of the movement establishing a self-contained economy within the movement.

== Life ==
Emmanuel Odumosu was born in 1915 to Jacob Odumosu. His grandfather, Joseph Odumosu (1863–1911), was a Christian traditional healer from Ijebu-Ode. Joseph Odumosu used his printing house to publish some of the earliest books on Yoruba indigenous medicine. His three-volume work Ìwòsàn written in Yoruba, provided instructions for more than 5,621 therapeutic interventions addressing issues such as gonorrhea, goiter, finding a suitable wife, poisoning, and adultery. According to historian Toyin Falola, Odumosu's work is regarded as "the best in the area of indigenous medicine."

Trained as a carpenter, Odumosu served with the Post and Telegraph Department during World War II. An active member in the postal workers union, a general strike in 1945 led to his disengagement from the department. He took on carpentry work and opened a shop on Lagos Island close to Oil Mill Street. However, he struggled as a carpenter and was constantly in debt, he was jailed for six months on charges brought by his creditors. During this period, Odumosu attended various Protestant churches in Lagos, but soon claimed he received visions and dreams from God. He interpreted some of the visions as messianic visions and that he was chosen as a messiah that has come to redeem the world. He began his rebirth by holding evening meetings close to his shop.

In June 1955, Odumosu publicly declared himself to be Jesus come back to life:

I am He. I am Jesus Christ, the very one whose second coming was foretold in the New Testament. I have come, and those who believe in me will have an everlasting life and joy. I am the missing of the trinity. I have come to prepare the faithful for the judgment day.

=== Universal College of Regeneration ===
Odumosu's early sermons emphasized duality of the world and self-discipline. The natural world which is filled with evil machinations, principalities and powers and a spiritual world, in which he had access. The spiritual world and natural world are in constant battle, with the former emphasized as the redeemer of the natural world. His religious movement started in 1952 at a location in Lagos Island, another major message was self-discipline; consisting of denouncing alcohol, women and tobacco.

At onset, initial congregation was small, about 30 members could be counted in 1954. During this time, he instituted tithe giving to assist the poor, Odumosu also encouraged members to fund his evangelical missions. His movement began to grow and better organized, the growth assisted with a donation by a wealthy convert who provided his property for Odumosu's use. One of those properties was in Ebute Metta, where Odumosu decided to settle the movement. Since the founding of the movement, members lived at their own residences, but after the movement to Ebute Metta, Odumosu asked them to leave their houses and live in rented properties close to the church building. Members declared their wealth to Odumosu who took 10% of the tithe and charged them rent.

To expand his movement, he began preaching his sermon with loudspeakers placed outside in the church hall, at a location close to Oyingbo Market, where he was sometimes derisively called 'Jesu Oyingbo'. At the new location, he began to emphasize humility and obedience, to initiate new male members, he will whip them with nine strokes of cane. In 1959, he declared himself Jesus, reduced his sermons and began to initiate various business ventures to fund a New Jerusalem. Among the ventures were Jolly Makers and Happy Day food canteens, Deluxe bakeries makers of Goodluck bread, the properties housing this venture were then expanded to include barber shops and lodging. Economy wise, the various businesses provided wages to his followers. In 1960, a schism in the church led to the exodus of most of his members. But Odumosu who had changed from preaching self-discipline to loyalty did not seem to mind, because to continue his business ventures, he needed loyal workers who will serve him.

The Universal College of Regeneration, established by Odumosu, became Africa's first megachurch. At its peak, the organisation had more than 2,000 followers, who gathered weekly at the commune on Manor Street in Lagos for religious activities.

Odumosu's sexual practices were less conservative than other Christian denominations and he was said to have established sexual rights over many females within his sect.

Odumosu died in 1988.

== See also ==
- List of people claimed to be Jesus
- Messiah complex
