= Petropavlovka, Kuraginsky District, Krasnoyarsk Krai =

Petropavlovka Петропавловка
- Village
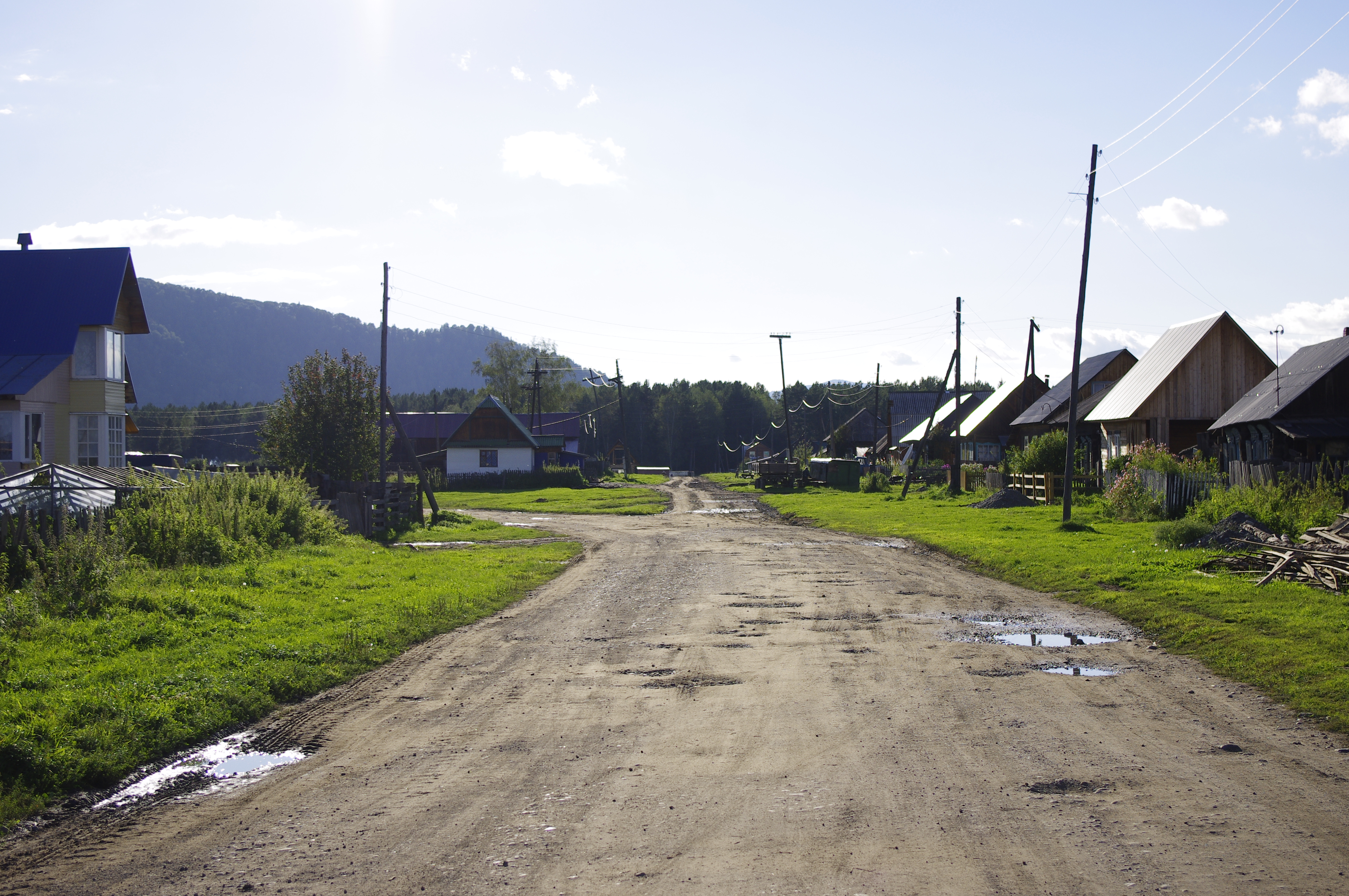

- Location within Krasnoyarsk Krai Location within Russia
- Coordinates: 53°53′50″N 93°39′18″E
- Country: Russia
- Region: Krasnoyarsk Krai
- District: Kuraginsky District
- Time zone: UTC+3:00

Petropavlovka (Russian: Петропа́вловка) is a rural locality (a village) in Cheremshansky Selsovet of Kuraginsky District, Krasnoyarsk Krai, Russia. The population was 790 as of 2010. Petropavlovka is known as the place near which the Church of the Last Testament, run by Vissarion, is based.
