= List of messiah claimants =

This is a list of notable people who have been said to be a messiah, either by themselves or by their followers. The list is divided into categories, which are sorted according to date of birth, if it is known.

== Jewish messiah claimants ==
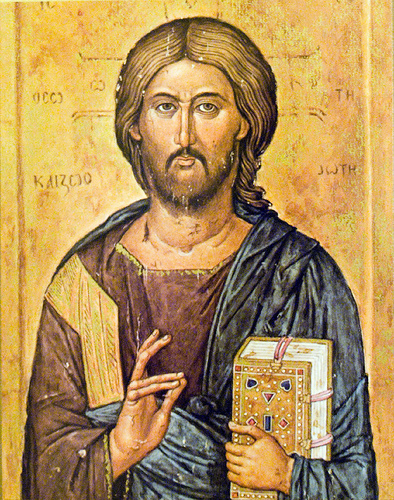
Icon of Jesus from Macedonia, 14th century

In Judaism, "messiah" originally meant "a divinely appointed king" or "anointed one", such as Aaron the brother of Moses, David, Cyrus the Great or Alexander the Great. Later, especially after the failure of the Hasmonean Kingdom (37 BC) and the Jewish–Roman wars (AD 66–135), the figure of the Jewish messiah was one who would deliver the Jews from oppression and usher in an Olam Haba ("world to come") or Messianic Age. However the term "false messiah" was largely absent from rabbinic literature. The first mention is in the Sefer Zerubbabel, from the mid-seventh century, which uses the term, mashiah sheker, ("false messiah").

- Jesus of Nazareth (c. 4 BC – 30/33 AD), a religious leader who was persecuted by the Roman Empire for alleged sedition and is believed by Christians to have been crucified and resurrected. Jews who believed him to be the Messiah were originally called Nazarenes and later they were known as Jewish Christians (the first Christians). Baháʼís, Muslims, and Christians (including Messianic Jews) believe him to be the Messiah.
- Dositheos the Samaritan (mid 1st century), Origen wrote that Dositheos wished to persuade the Samaritans that he was the Jewish Messiah. (Hom. xxv in Lucam; Contra Celsum, I, lvii).
- Simon bar Kokhba, born Simon ben Koseva, (d. 135 AD) who led the apical Bar Kokhba revolt against the Roman Empire. For three years, bar Kokhba ruled as the nasi, or prince, of a semi-independent secessionist state in Israel. Some rabbinical scholars, including the great sage Akiva, proclaimed bar Kokhba as the Messiah. He died during the rebels' last stand at the fortress of Betar, after which the rebellion was brutally crushed and the land was left largely decimated, cementing both the slowly growing Jewish diaspora and the schism between Christianity and Judaism.
- Shlomo Molcho, born Diogo Pires (1500–1532) in Lisbon to parents who were Jewish converts to Christianity. After meeting David Reuveni, he left his post as secretary to the king's council, traveled to Damascus, Safed, Jerusalem and later Solonika, where he studied kabbalah and became a mystic. He was eventually reunited with Reuveni, declared his aspirations as messiah, and was finally burned at the stake by the Holy Roman Emperor Charles V, for refusing to convert back to Christianity.
- Sabbatai Zevi (alternative spellings: Shabbetai, Sabbetai, Shabbesai; Zvi, Tzvi) (b. at Smyrna 1626; d. at Dulcigno (present day Ulcinj) 1676), a Sephardic ordained rabbi from Smyrna (now İzmir, Turkey), who was active throughout the Ottoman Empire and claimed to be the long-awaited Messiah. He was the founder of the Sabbatean movement, whose followers subsequently were to be known as Dönmeh "converts" or crypto-Jews - one of the most important messianic movements, whose influence was widespread throughout Jewry. His influence is felt even today. After his death, Sabbatai was followed by a line of putative followers who declared themselves Messiahs and are sometimes grouped as the "Sabbethaian Messiahs".
- Shukr Kuhayl I and Judah ben Shalom were a pair of preachers in Yemen in the 1860s and 1870s, who claimed to be the Messiah. Shukr Kuhayl I was an ascetic and was executed in 1865. Judah ben Shalom claimed in 1868 to be the resurrected Shukr Kuhayl and created an extensive, well-funded organization with himself at the head. Jacob Saphir wrote that most Temani Jews believed in them, and convinced rabbis in Jerusalem to publicly censure ben Shalom, leading to his defunding and downfall.
- Menachem Mendel Schneerson (1902–1994), seventh Rebbe of Chabad Lubavitch; some of his followers believed that he was the Jewish Messiah during his lifetime, and some of them continue to believe so after his death in 1994. The number of believers grew in size after his death. Some of his followers believe that Schneerson never died. While Schneerson remained cryptic about such assertions, many of his followers do believe he was the Jewish Messiah. The issue remains controversial within both the Chabad movement and the broader Jewish community.

== Christian messiah claimants ==
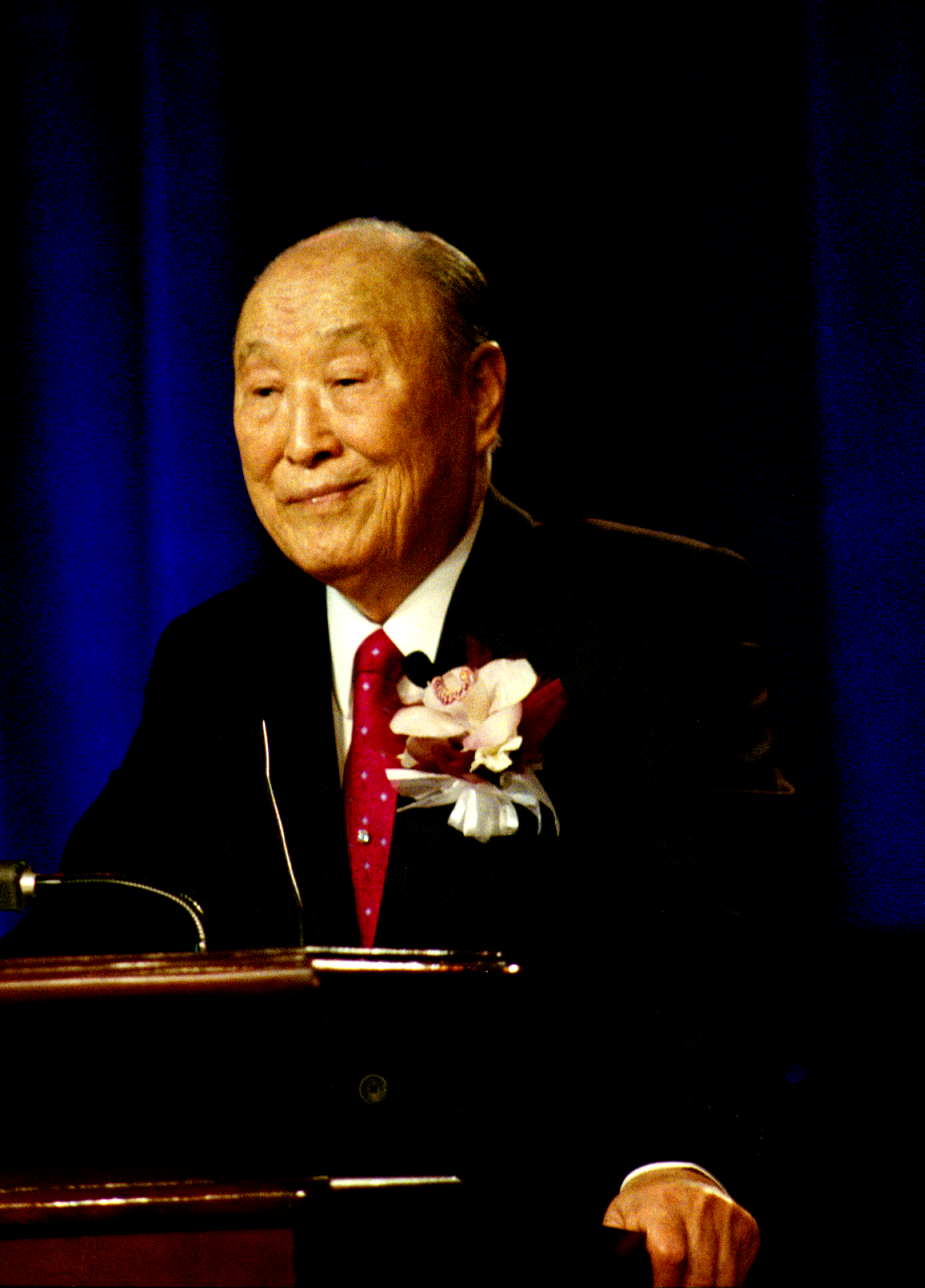
Sun Myung Moon

The Christian Bible states that Jesus will come again in some fashion; various people have claimed to, in fact, be the Second Coming of Jesus. Others have styled themselves new messiahs under the umbrella of Christianity. The Synoptic gospels (Matthew 24:4, 6, 24; Mark 13:5, 21-22; and Luke 21:3) all use the term pseudochristos for messianic pretenders.

- Ann Lee (1736–1784), a central figure to the Shakers, who thought she "embodied all the perfections of God" in female form and considered herself in 1772 to be Christ's female counterpart.
- John Nichols Thom (1799–1838), who had achieved fame and followers as Sir William Courtenay and adopted the claim of Messiah after a period in a mental institute.
- Abd-ru-shin (Oskar Ernst Bernhardt, 18 April 1875 – 6 December 1941), founder of the Grail Movement.
- Lou de Palingboer (Louwrens Voorthuijzen) (1898-1968), a Dutch charismatic leader who claimed to be God as well as the Messiah from 1950 until his death in 1968.
- Ahn Sahng-hong (1918–1985), founder of the World Mission Society Church of God and worshiped by the members as the Messiah.
- Sun Myung Moon (1920–2012), founder and leader of the Unification Church established in Seoul, South Korea, who considered himself the Second Coming of Christ, but not Jesus himself. It is generally believed by Unification Church members ("Moonies") that he was the Messiah and the Second Coming of Christ and was anointed to fulfill Jesus's unfinished mission.
- Anne Hamilton-Byrne (born Evelyn Grace Victoria Edwards; 30 December 1921 – 13 June 2019), founder of The Family, Australia, claimed to have been the reincarnation of Jesus.
- Cho Hee-seung (1931–2004), founder of the Victory Altar New Religious Movement, which refers to him as “the Victor Christ” and “God incarnated”. Died in the midst of a series of legal battles in which he was alternately convicted and acquitted on charges of fraud and instigation of the murders of multiple opponents.
- Lee Man-Hee (born 15 September 1931), founder of Shincheonji Church of Jesus, a new religious movement based in South Korea. Also known as The One Who Overcomes, he claims to be chosen by Jesus to be the next immortal savior of the world
- Jung Myung-seok (born 1945), a South Korean who was a member of the Unification Church in the 1970s, before breaking off to found the dissenting group now known as Providence Church in 1980. He also considers himself the Second Coming of Christ, but not Jesus himself. He believes he has come to finish the incomplete message and mission of Jesus Christ, asserting that he is the Messiah and has the responsibility to save all mankind. He claims that the Christian doctrine of resurrection is false but that people can be saved through him. Jung Myung-seok was convicted of rape by the Supreme Court of Korea and spent 10 years in prison (2008-2018). He was again indicted in South Korea on October 28, 2022, for sexually assaulting two female followers between 2018 and 2022.
- Claude Vorilhon, now known as Raël "messenger of the Elohim" (born 1946), a French professional test driver and former car journalist who became founder and leader of UFO religion the Raël Movement in 1972. Raëlism teaches that life on Earth was scientifically created by a species of extraterrestrials, which they call Elohim. He claimed he met an extraterrestrial humanoid in 1973 and became the Messiah. He then devoted himself to the task he said he was given by his "biological father", an extraterrestrial named Yahweh.
- José Luis de Jesús Miranda (1946–2013), founder and leader of Creciendo en Gracia sect (Growing In Grace International Ministry, Inc.), based in Miami, Florida. He was a Puerto Rican preacher who had claimed to be both "the Man Jesus Christ" and the Antichrist at the same time, and exhibited a "666" tattoo on his forearm, a behavior his followers also adopted. He has referred to himself as Jesucristo Hombre, which translates to "Jesus Christ made Man". He claimed he was indwelled with the same spirit that dwelled in Jesus. Miranda died on August 14, 2013, due to liver cancer.
- Inri Cristo (born 1948) of Indaial, Brazil, a claimant to be the second Jesus.
- Apollo Quiboloy (born 1950), Filipino founder and leader of the Kingdom of Jesus Christ religious group, who claims that Jesus Christ is the "Almighty Father," that Quiboloy is "His Appointed Son," and that salvation is now completed. He proclaims himself to be the "Appointed Son of God". On November 11, 2021, Quiboloy was indicted by the United States Department of Justice for allegedly coercing girls and young women to have sex with him. These victims were threatened with eternal damnation and physical punishment if they didn’t comply. The indictment also included allegations that Quiboloy ran a sex-trafficking operation. Girls as young as 12 were allegedly trafficked through the fraudulent California charity “Children’s Joy.” Quiboloy was arrested by Philippine police on September 8, 2024.
- Brian David Mitchell (born 1953) was convicted May 25, 2011, for the 2002 kidnapping and rape of Elizabeth Smart. He believed himself the fore-ordained angel born on earth to be the Davidic "servant" prepared by God as a type of Messiah who would restore the divinely led kingdom of Israel to the world in preparation for Christ's Second Coming. Mitchell's belief in such an end-times figure – also known among many fundamentalist Latter Day Saints as "the One Mighty and Strong" – appeared to be based in part on a reading of the biblical Book of Isaiah by the independent LDS Hebraist, Avraham Gileadi, with whom Mitchell became familiar as a result of his previous participation in Sterling Allan's American Study Group.
- Ante Pavlović (1957–2020), a Croatian self-proclaimed chiropractor who claimed to be a reincarnation of Jesus Christ.
- Sergey Torop (born 1961), who started to call himself "Vissarion", founder of the Church of the Last Testament and the spiritual community Ecopolis Tiberkul in Southern Siberia.
- Alan John Miller (born 1962), founder of Divine Truth, a new religious movement based in Australia. Also known as A.J. Miller, he claims to be Jesus of Nazareth through reincarnation. Miller was formerly a Jehovah's Witness.
- Yang Xiangbin (born 1973) is believed to be the identity of a woman referred to as "Lightning Deng" and "the female Christ" in the literature of Eastern Lightning, a Chinese Christian new religious movement. Zhao Weishan, founder and administrative leader of Eastern Lightning, claimed that Yang revealed herself to be the Second Coming of Christ in 1992.

== Muslim messiah claimants ==
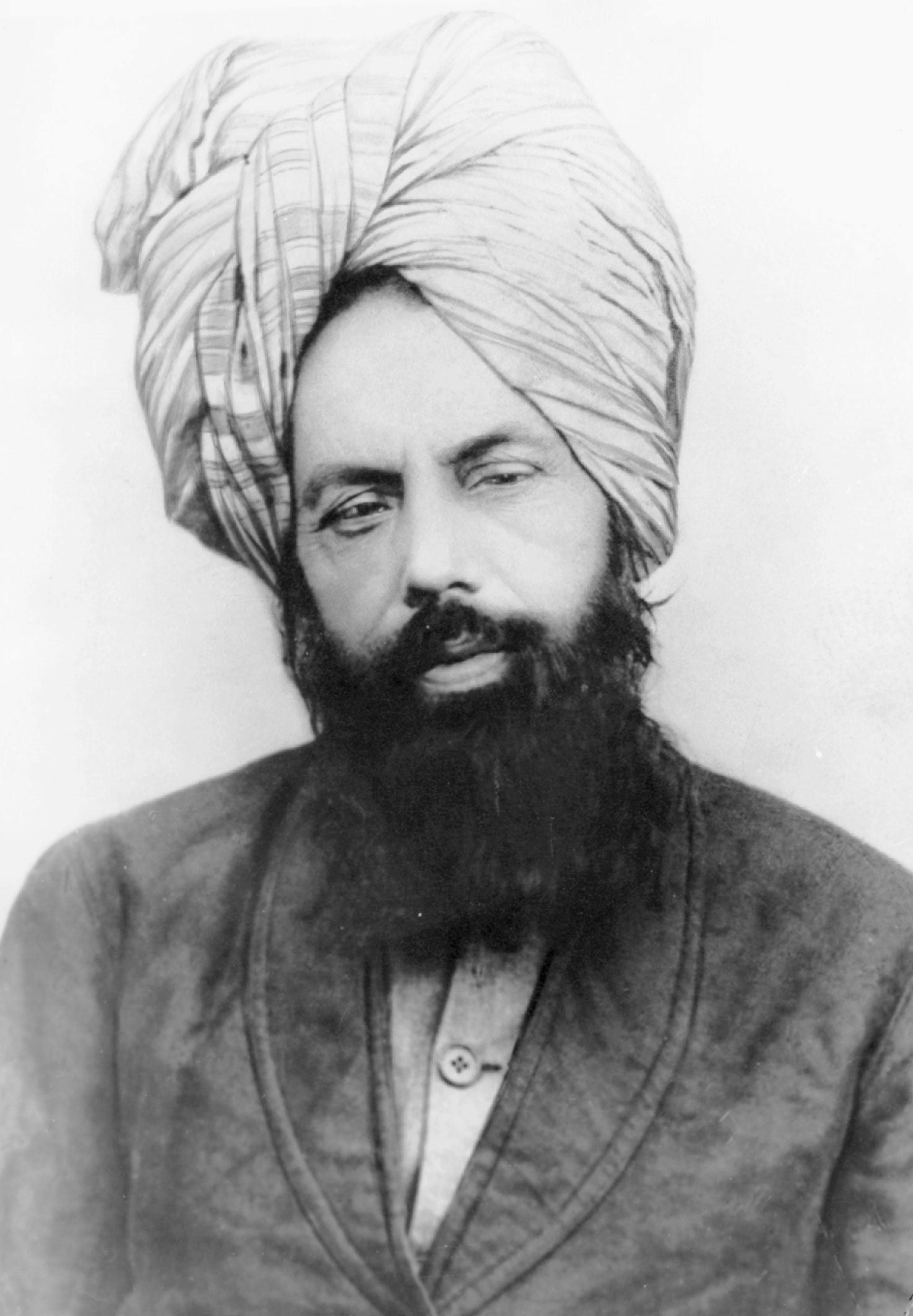
Mirza Ghulam Ahmad

Islamic tradition has a prophecy of the Mahdi, who will come alongside the return of Isa (Jesus).

- Mirza Ghulam Ahmad of Qadian, India (1835–1908), proclaimed himself to be both the expected Mahdi and Messiah. Crucially, however, he claimed that Jesus had died a natural death after surviving crucifixion, and that prophecies concerning his future advent referred to the Mahdi himself bearing the qualities and character of Jesus rather than to his physical return alongside the Mahdi. He founded the Ahmadiyya Movement in 1889 envisioning it to be the rejuvenation of Islam. Adherents of the Ahmadiyya movement claim to be strictly Muslim, but are widely viewed by other Muslim groups as disbelievers and heretics.
- Riaz Ahmed Gohar Shahi (born 25 November 1941) is a spiritual leader and founder of the spiritual groups Anjuman Serfaroshan-e-Islam and RAGS International, now known as Messiah Foundation International. MFI reports that Shahi claimed to be the Mahdi, Messiah, and Kalki Avatar. Shahi has been also accused of claiming the status of a prophet. Shahi's supporters claim that his face became prominent on the Moon, Sun, nebula star and the Black Stone in Mecca, and that these appearances are signs from God that Gohar Shahi is the awaited Mahdi, Messiah, and Kalki Avatar. According to MFI's website, Shahi claimed to be Awaited Messiah, but not the second coming of Jesus and claim that Jesus has also returned to support the Shahi. Gohar Shahi claimed to have met with Jesus in America. Mainstream Muslim scholars have rejected Shahi's claims, and condemned his teachings as blasphemous.

== Baháʼí messiah claimants ==
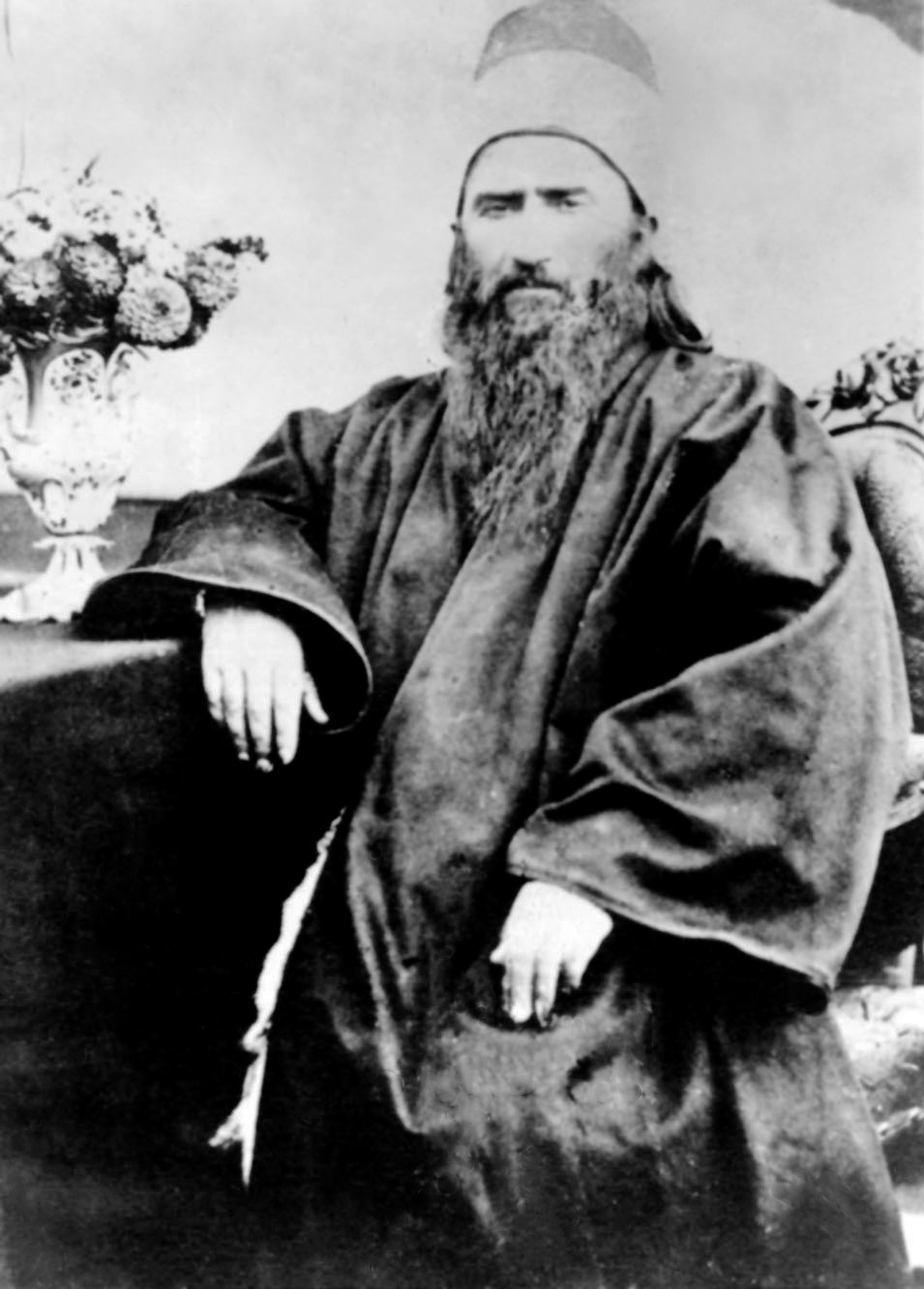
Baháʼu'lláh

This list features people who are said, either by themselves or their followers, to be the messianic fulfillment of two or more religious traditions.

- Baháʼu'lláh, Mirza Husayn 'Ali Nuri, (1817–1892), born Shiite, adopting Bábism in 1844 (see Báb or "Ali Muhammad Shirazi" in List of Mahdi claimants). In 1863, Baháʼu'lláh claimed to be the promised one of all religions, and founded the Baháʼí Faith. He claimed to be the fulfillment of the prophecies of the coming of a promised figure found in all 6 of the major prophetic religions (Judaism, Christianity, Islam, Zoroastrianism, Hinduism and Buddhism) as noted in the authoritative history of the Baha'i Faith. He also claimed to be the very prophet predicted by the Báb as "He Whom God shall make manifest" His followers have also claimed that his coming fulfilled prophecies of various smaller (often native) religions.

== Zoroastrian messiah claimants ==
- Bahram Chobin, after he usurped the throne of the Sassanian Empire, declared himself to be the Messiah in the midst of the eschatological times of the late 6th century AD

== Other messiah claimants ==
This list features people who have been said, either by themselves or their followers, to be some form of a messiah that do not easily fit into Jewish, Christian, Islamic or other eschatological traditions.

- Cyrus Teed (1839–1908), proponent of the Hollow Earth theory who created a distinct model in which the world is an inverted sphere that the rest of universe can be seen from by looking inward and claimed to be the incarnation of Jesus Christ after being electrically shocked when attempting to practice alchemy with doses of magnetism during 1869.
- Mokiti Okada (1888-1955) Founder of church of world messianity and the creator of Johrei Claimed to be the Messiah.
- Adolf Hitler (1889–1945) of Nazi Germany has been claimed by some practitioners of Esoteric Nazism as the messiah, including Colin Jordan, Savitri Devi, and Miguel Serrano. Hitler had never claimed to be the messiah during his life, having had changing views towards religion.
- Nirmala Srivastava (1923–2011), guru of Sahaja Yoga, proclaimed herself to be the Comforter promised by Jesus (that is, the incarnation of the Holy Ghost / Adi Shakti).
- World Teacher, a being claimed to be the Theosophical Maitreya and the Messiah (promised one) of all religions. He is said to have descended from the higher planes and manifested a physical body in early 1977 in the Himalayas, then on 19 July 1977 he is said to have taken a commercial airplane flight from Pakistan to England. He is currently said to be living in secret in London; promoted by New Age activist Benjamin Creme and his organization, Share International (See Maitreya (Benjamin Creme)).
- David Icke (born 29 April 1952), New Age conspiracy theorist who came up with the idea of Draconians and claimed to be the "son of God" during an interview on Wogan in 1991.
- Ezra Miller (born 1992), an actor, has claimed to be Jesus, the next Messiah, and the devil, saying they would bring about a Native American revolution.
- Li Hongzhi (born 1951 or 1952), leader of the new religious movement Falun Gong. Human Rights Watch noted his teachings contained salvationist and apocalyptic ideas. According to David A. Palmer, Li's teachings present himself as a messianic figure that revealed to the world the "fundamental Law of the universe" in which Li teaches is the only means to protect against the apocalypse. Li claims that orthodox religions are incapable of bringing salvation to humanity and that only his teachings can save humanity. In 1997, Li declared he had already prevented the destruction of the universe. In 2002, he claimed credit for preventing a predetermined comet catastrophe and World War III.
- Chris Cantelmo (1962–2019), founder and leader of Cantelmoism, a religious movement based on the belief that one can contact God using the drug DMT.
- Suzannah Weiss (born 1990), a writer and sexologist who performs as Shoshanna Blanca or Jesus Christ Pornstar, has identified herself as one of several leaders in a worldwide messiah movement. Through her performance art, she advocates a sex-positive Christianity and encourages people to stop waiting for a messiah and find their own role in saving the world.

== See also ==
- List of avatar claimants
- List of Buddha claimants
- List of people who have been considered deities
- False prophet
- List of founders of religions
- Jerusalem syndrome
- List of people who claimed to be Jesus
- List of Mahdi claimants
- Messiah complex
- Messianic Age
- Messianism
- List of pantheons
- List of religions

== Other sources ==
- Hogue, John Messiahs: The Visions and Prophecies for the Second Coming (1999) Elements Books ISBN 1-86204-549-6
- Jewish Encyclopedia, a public-domain work hosted at www.jewishencyclopedia.com/
- Andreas Plagge: "Oskar Ernst Bernhardt". In: Biographisch-Bibliographisches Kirchenlexikon (BBKL). Band 22, Bautz, Nordhausen 2003, ISBN 3-88309-133-2, Sp. 120–122, .
- Lothar Gassmann: Zukunft, Zeit, Zeichen. Aufruf zur Wachsamkaeit, Verlag für Reformatorische Erneurung, Kaiserstr.78, D-42329 Wuppertal, 103 Seiten, .
- Patrick Diemling: Neuoffenbarungen Religionswissenschaftliche Perspektiven auf Texte und Medien des 19. und 20. Jahrhunderts, Universitätsverlag Potsdam, 2012, .
