= Lou de Palingboer =

Dutch religious leader

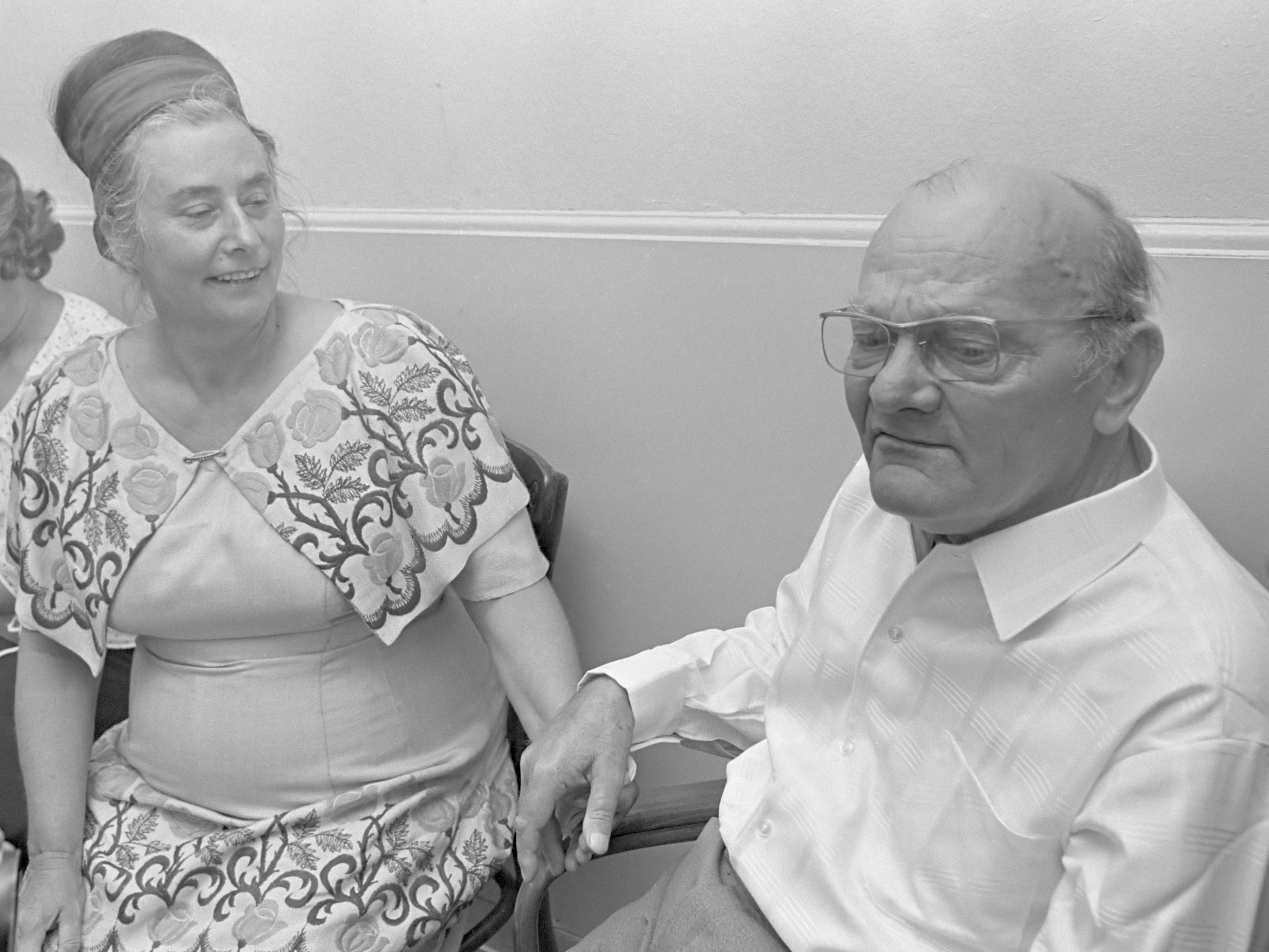
Mientje and Lou Voorthuijzen (1967)

Lou de Palingboer (19 February 1898 - 23 March 1968) was the founder and figurehead of a new religious movement and isolated community called the "White House" in the Netherlands.

== Information ==
Lou was born Louwrens Voorthuijzen in Breezand. He had a strong religious interest from an early age, probably under the influence of his devout father. He chose the profession of fisherman. After a failed marriage he met Mien Wiertz and began to believe under her influence that he must save the world from the devil.

Voorthuijzen sold his boat and took up employment as an eel vendor at the Dappermarkt in Amsterdam, where he became known as Lou de Palingboer (Lou the eel vendor). From his market stall, he preached to his customers that he was "the resurrected body of Jesus Christ". He would elaborate further in a nearby café. A circle of followers formed around him. In 1954, he began holding weekly meetings in the Frascati and De Brakke Grond theatres, where he captivated his audience with a mix of mystical language and down-to-earth humor.

In 1957, a rich supporter bought a large house in Muiderberg in the municipality Muiden. They called it the "White House", and lived in it communally. His followers believed him to be a God. According to Harry Mulisch's Voer voor psychologen (Fodder for Psychologists), he claimed to be the author of the Bible. Some members of his group rejected medicine in favour of his blessing as a cure for ailments. Lou himself claimed to be immortal.

Around this time, Dutch society began to see them as a cult. Tensions frequently arose when one partner of a couple was not "in Lou" and the other one was. This resulted in a number of divorces in which Lou was summoned to testify, which he disliked. Lou moved to Agimont in the French-speaking part of Belgium to avoid summons of this kind.

After his death in Belgium in 1968, the movement seems to have dissipated. Wiertz, who moved to Spain, continues to have faith in him and there are a few other elderly believers left.

== See also ==
- God complex
- List of people who have claimed to be Jesus
