= List of Buddha claimants =

This is a list of notable people who have claimed to have attained enlightenment and become buddhas, claimed to be manifestations of bodhisattvas, identified themselves as Gautama Buddha or Maitreya Buddha, or been honored as buddhas or bodhisattvas.

== Claimants ==
=== Real people ===
- Wu Zetian (Emperor Shengshen of Wu Zhou; 624–705) – founder of the Wu Zhou dynasty of China and the only legitimate empress regnant in Chinese history. Gained popular support by advocating Buddhism but ruthlessly persecuted her opponents within the royal family (by cutting off their arms and legs and inserting them in jars) and the nobility. She proclaimed herself an incarnation of Maitreya and made Luoyang the "holy capital".
- Gung Ye (c. 869–918) – Korean warlord and king of the short-lived state of Taebong during the 10th century. Claimed to be the living incarnation of Maitreya and ordered his subjects to worship him. His claim was rejected by most Buddhist monks and later he was dethroned and killed by his own servants.
- Nurhaci (Emperor Taizu of Qing; 1559–1626) – founder of the Later Jin dynasty of China. Believed he was a manifestation of Manjushri Bodhisattva.
- Bahá'u'lláh (1817–1892) – prophet of Persian origin, founder of the Baháʼí Faith stated publicly in 1863 CE that he is the promised Manifestation of God for this age predicted in all prophetic religions of the past. Shoghi Effendi, eldest grandson and authorized interpreter of the sacred writings of Bahá'u'lláh and guardian of Baháʼí Faith from 1921 to 1957, identifies Bahá'u'lláh as "the fifth buddha" and "a Buddha named Maitreye, the Buddha of universal fellowship".
- Mirza Ghulam Ahmad (1835–1908) – Ghulam Ahmad has claimed many titles he says were given to him by God including being a universal prophet for all religions (including Buddhism). In 1889 he found the Ahmadiyya Muslim Community, preaching Islam as a universal faith which came to support the true teachings of all other religions lost over the centuries.
- Lu Zhongyi (1849–1925) – the 17th patriarch of the I-Kuan Tao. I-Kuan Tao followers believe that he is the first leader of the "White Sun" Era, the era of the apocalypse, thus he is the incarnation of Maitreya.
- B. R. Ambedkar (1891–1956) is regarded as a Bodhisattva, the Maitreya, among the Navayana followers. In practice, the Navayana followers revere Ambedkar, states Jim Deitrick, as virtually on par with the Buddha. He is considered as the one prophesied to appear and teach the dhamma after it was forgotten, his iconography is a part of Navayana shrines and he is shown with a halo. Though Ambedkar states Navayana to be atheist, Navayana viharas and shrines features images of the Buddha and Ambedkar, and the followers bow and offer prayers before them in practice. According to Junghare, for the followers of Navayana, Ambedkar has become a deity and is devotionally worshipped.
- L. Ron Hubbard (1911–1986) – founder of Scientology. Hubbard had claimed he was Maitreya during his lifetime. In his 1955–1956 poem Hymn of Asia, Hubbard starts the poem by asking "Am I Metteyya?" (an alternate spelling for "Maitreya") then listing several matched traits that Hubbard claimed were predicted in the "Metteya Legend" (another alternate spelling for "Maitreya") such as coming from the West, having golden hair or red hair (Hubbard was red-haired), and showing up in a time of world peril (this poem was written during the Cold War), with the earliest of the predicted dates for Maitreya's return being 2,500 years after Gautama Buddha, or roughly 1950 (in 1950, Hubbard published his book Dianetics: The Modern Science of Mental Health which introduced the concept of Dianetics, both the book and concept were incorporated into Scientology when he founded the religion). The scholar Stephen A. Kent has noted that these traits were not actually mentioned in the Buddhist texts and some of these are actually contradicted by the texts. Kent notes that the Buddhist texts actually say that Maitreya will be born to royalty whose domain is very wealthy, prosperous and with a large population and will have black hair.
- Jim Jones (1931–1978) – leader of the Peoples Temple cult. Jones claimed to be a living incarnation of the Buddha as well as Jesus Christ, Pharaoh Akhenaten, Father Divine and Vladimir Lenin.
- Bhagwan Shree Rajneesh (1931–1990) – also known as Acharya Rajneesh from the 1960s onwards, as Bhagwan Shree Rajneesh (during the 1970s and 1980s and as Osho from 1989) was an Indian mystic, guru, and spiritual teacher who garnered an international following. Osho later said he became spiritually enlightened on 21 March 1953, when he was 21 years old, in a mystical experience while sitting under a tree in the Bhanvartal Garden in Jabalpur.
- Ariffin Mohammed (1941–2016) – founder of the Sky Kingdom. His movement had a commune based in Besut, Terengganu, that was demolished by the Malaysian government in 2005. He also claimed to be an incarnation of the Mahdi, Muhammad, Jesus, and Shiva.
- Lu Sheng-yen (b. 1945) – founder and spiritual teacher of the newly created Buddhist lineage called the True Buddha School. Lu claims that in the late 1980s, he had reached enlightenment while training under a formless teacher and that he is an incarnation of Padmakumara, a deity in the Western Pure Land kingdom. He has since then been called by his followers "Living Buddha Lian Sheng". Lu has publicly stated that Living Buddha is a literal translation of the Chinese honorific 活佛, Huófó. This is the Chinese equivalent of the Tibetan terms Tulku and Rinpoche, and the Mongolian terms Khubilghan and Khutughtu.
- Ram Bahadur Bomjon (other names Buddha Boy, Maha Sambodhi, Dharma Sangha, Maitriya Guru, Palden Dorje, Tapasvi; b. 1989 or 1990) – a 36 year old Nepalese ascetic whom many have hailed as a new Buddha. Naming himself publicly from 2012 as "Maitriya" Guru, he and his followers openly claim that he is the awaited Maitreya Buddha. He is a controversial figure currently under investigation for rape, and separately for the disappearance of four of his ashram members.

=== Mythological figures ===
- Kalki – Hindu Avatar claimed by many scholars and analysts as Maitreya.

== See also ==
- List of avatar claimants
- List of bodhisattvas
- List of messiah claimants
- List of people claimed to be Jesus
- List of people who have been considered deities
- Maitreya (Theosophy) (modeled on Buddhist Maitreya)
- Maitreya (Benjamin Creme) (Maitreya in Neo-Theosophy)
- People claiming to be the Mahdi
