= Lord Our Righteousness Church =

Religious community in New Mexico, United States

The Lord Our Righteousness Church (LORC) was, as of 2008, a religious community in Union County, New Mexico, in the northeast of that state, in a community its participants refer to as "Strong City". The group moved to New Mexico from Idaho, in 2000. As of 2000 it numbered perhaps 80 adherents, living in what news media termed a "compound", in makeshift dwellings; as of May 2008, it was reported to have about 50.

Following accusations that the group's leader, Wayne Bent (who went by the name "Michael Travesser" in LORC), had had inappropriate contact with minors, New Mexico State Police removed three minors from the LORC compound after an April 2008 investigation. Arrested two weeks later, Bent was charged with three counts of criminal sexual contact with a minor, and three counts of contributing to the delinquency of a minor. A jury trial began on November 17, 2008, and on December 15, 2008, Bent was convicted of one count of criminal sexual contact of a minor and two counts of contributing to the delinquency of a minor, with acquittal on remaining charges.

Bent received the maximum sentence for his conviction, 18 years, but with 8 years suspended, which required he serve at least 8 1/2 years before becoming eligible for parole. After an eventful period of incarceration—including overturn and reinstatement of the convictions by the New Mexico Court of Appeals and Supreme Court (respectively, in June 2011 and October 2012)—Bent served further time and was paroled in February 2016 following a cancer diagnosis.

== Background ==
Wayne Bent has appeared in news reports as the leader of The Lord Our Righteousness Church; it has been referred to as "an apocalyptic sect" (e.g., by the Associated Press). The sect's compound is in northeastern New Mexico, in the Union County, New Mexico jurisdiction, in what its members refer to as "Strong City". The group moved to New Mexico in 2000, from Sandpoint, Idaho. As of 2000 it numbered perhaps 80 adherents, living in a "compound" of makeshift dwellings (modular buildings, recreational vehicles, and tents). as of May 2008, it was reported to have about 50.

Bent, born Wayne Curtis Bent on May 18, 1941, is known as Michael Travesser within the church. Bent, once a Seventh-day Adventist pastor, left his denomination with others of like mind in 1987 and has since referred to that church as one of the "daughters of the great harlot" condemned in the book of Revelation. Bent claims that, during an experience in 2000, God told him: "You are Messiah." Bent has since stated, "I am the embodiment of God. I am divinity and humanity combined."

== Legal issues ==
=== Investigation ===
Three minors were taken into state custody, for their own protection, in April 2008. A New Mexico state Children, Youth and Families Department (CYFD) spokeswoman said that the three minor teens were taken from the compound in the days after an April 22, 2008, investigation. The state judge hearing the case has issued a gag order, and state officials have provided no further details of the investigation.

=== Arrest and charges ===
Two weeks after the children were removed and the gag order was in place, Bent was arrested by the New Mexico State Police. The charges were three counts of criminal sexual contact with a minor and three counts of contributing to the delinquency of a minor. The ages and sex of the children in state custody were made public: a 16-year-old boy (no charges of abuse were filed in connection with the boy), a 16-year-old girl and a 13-year-old girl. He was held on $500,000 bond with an arraignment scheduled for May 8, 2008. Following his arraignment, the judge reduced the bail to $55,000; as of May 9, he remained incarcerated.

The initial charges refer to Bent having inappropriately touched three minor girls in 2006 and 2007. According to the state Department of Public Safety, one of the girls no longer lives in the community.

=== Trial and disclosures ===
Both the prosecution and the defense excused one judge in the case. Union County Judge Gerald E. Baca was appointed the case on July 2, 2008. The jury trial started November 17, 2008.

Bent admitted to having sexual intercourse multiple times with his son's wife; both he and his son state that "God forced Michael" to commit this act of consummation. Bent asserts that though he lay "naked with virgins" and the virgins asked him for sex, he refused. A news report stated that New Mexico authorities released one of the young women previously taken from the compound from state custody, a report that also appeared in a June 17 update from Bent's website.

=== Conviction and sentencing ===
On December 15, 2008, jurors convicted Bent of one count of criminal sexual contact of a minor and two counts of contributing to the delinquency of a minor. He was acquitted of a second charge of criminal sexual contact with a minor. The sect's "compound", termed "Strong City", is in Union County, New Mexico, and Bent was allowed to return there, pending sentencing.

On December 30, Judge Gerald Baca imposed the maximum sentence of 18 years but suspended eight years, indicating that he would have to serve at least 8 1/2 years before becoming eligible for release.

=== Initial incarceration ===
An Albuquerque news station reported that as of September 11, 2009, Bent has been on hunger strike while in prison, and a judge has ordered that force-feeding be used should it become necessary.

=== Overturn and reinstatment of conviction ===
On June 28, 2011, the New Mexico Court of Appeals overturned all convictions against Wayne Bent. The court determined the grand jury was not legally assembled. The three-judge decision was unanimous; Judge Roderick T. Kennedy presented the opinion of the court, regardng the consequence of the illegal assembly:

As a result, the indictment issued by the grand jury was void and the district court did not have jurisdiction to proceed with the trial in this case...

However, on October 22, 2012, the New Mexico Supreme Court overturned the New Mexico Court of Appeals ruling.

=== Remaining incarceration, and release ===
Bent would serve out the remainder of his sentence in prison, for the next four years. He was paroled in February 2016, after being diagnosed with a cancer that threatened the hearing in his left ear.

== Post-incarceration developments ==
Bent published a book-length treatment about his legal case, on his website. The title of the publication, The Little Book, is taken from a reference found in the biblical book of Revelation, chapter ten.

The group's website has been taken down several times and reinstated. It contains frequently-updated writings and videos, including a nearly two-hour-long documentary.

== Media coverage ==
British journalist Alex Hannaford visited Strong City in 2004, investigating claims that the group was contemplating suicide. His feature, including interviews with Wayne Bent, his adult son Jeff, and various sect members, was published in the UK the same year. Hannaford later wrote a follow-up piece for the Sunday Times magazine in the UK.

The documentary, The End of the World Cult, aired three years later, on Channel 4 in the UK. Among other things, it covers Bent's announcement that the Day of Judgment began on October 31, 2007. A shorter film version, including interviews with cult experts, Inside a Cult, was broadcast in Australia on ABC (and on the National Geographic Channel in the United States). Wayne Bent's son, Jeff, self-published a claim that the that the National Geographic documentary was inaccurate and inflammatory.

== See also ==
- Disconfirmed expectancy
- Doomsday cult
- List of people who have claimed to be Jesus
- Millenarianism
