= List of avatar claimants =

This is a list of notable people who have explicitly claimed and are considered by others to be the Avatars of the Supreme Being or of a more limited expansion of Ishvara or other expression of divinity. This list does not include the traditional Dashavatara (ten avatars of Vishnu) of Hinduism.

== Claimants ==
- Meher Baba - "I am the Avatar of this Age!" "You know that you are a human being, and I know that I am the Avatar. It is my whole life!" "Irrespective of doubts and convictions, and for the Infinite Love I bear for one and all, I continue to come as the Avatar, to be judged time and again by humanity in its ignorance, in order to help man distinguish the Real from the false." He maintained he was the Avatar, God in human form.
- Mother Meera - claims to be an avatar of Shakti, the primordial mother goddess. The sense of avatar as mother goddess is unique to the sect of Hinduism called Shaktism.
- Sathya Sai Baba - claimed to be an avatar of Shiva and Shakthi.
- Kalki Bhagawan and Amma Bhagawan - This couple from South India claim to be the Kalki avatar of Vishnu and his consort Lakshmi respectively.
- Mirza Husayn 'Ali Nuri, Baháʼu'lláh (1817–1892), is regarded by his followers as the “reincarnation of Krishna” and the “Tenth Avatar” and the “Immaculate Manifestation of Krishna” according to Shoghi Effendi, the Guardian of the Baháʼí Faith. He is also regarded as the fulfillment of the Messianic expectations of the other prophetic religions (Judaism, Christianity, Islam, Zoroastrianism and Buddhism).
- Adi Da Samraj claimed to be the first fully realised Avataric Incarnation of the Divine, representing the full spectrum of sacred attributes: abiding in a state of “Love-Bliss-Consciousness", and completing and surpassing the Causal Paths of: Buddhist, Advaita Vedanta, Taoism, Transcendentalists, Jedists, Monists and various other Non-Dualists who rely upon ego-separative means of 'turning of attention away from 'not-Self' and the 'World' to attain temporary or partial relief in Consciousness

== See also ==
- List of Buddha claimants
- List of Mahdi claimants
- List of messiah claimants
- List of people who have been considered deities
- List of people claimed to be Jesus
