= Arise Evans =

Welsh prophet

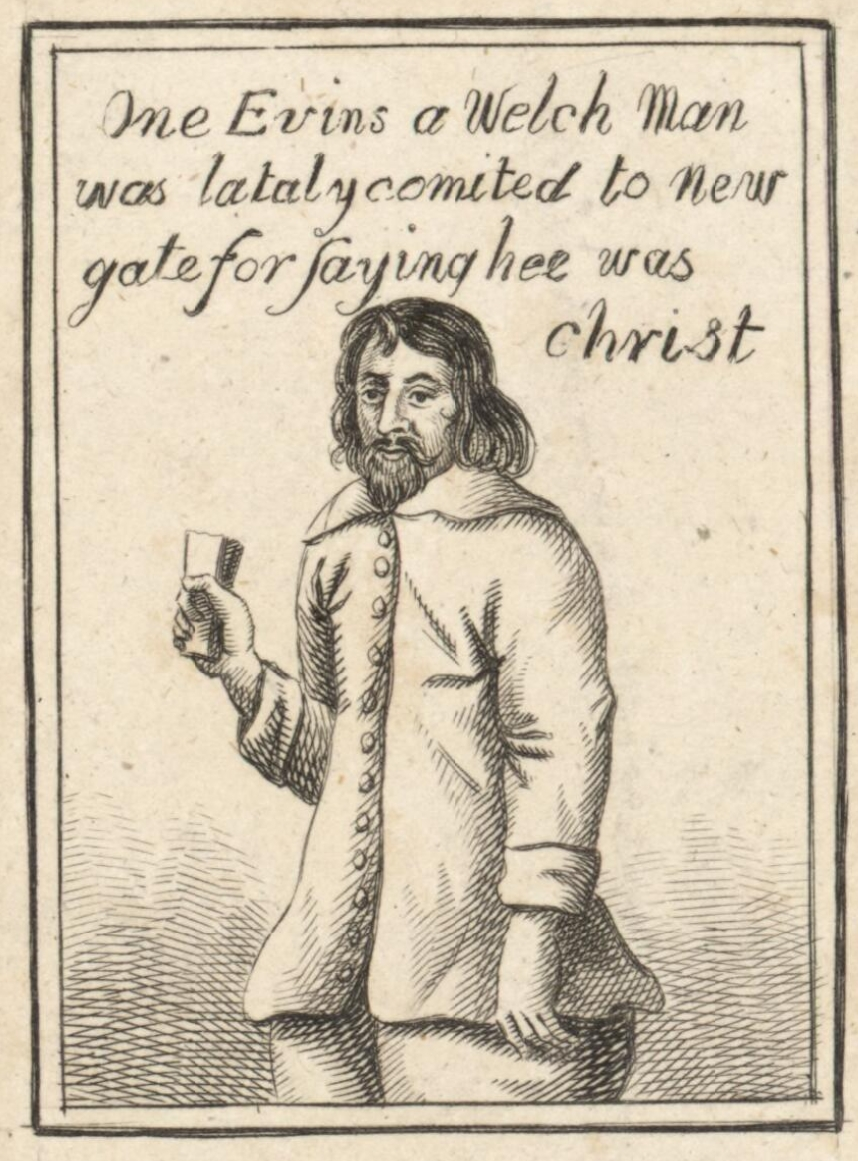
- An etching of Rhys 'Arise' Evans
- Born: ca. 1607; Llangelynnin, Gwynedd
- Died: ca. 1660; Newgate Prison?
- Other name: Rhys/Rice Evans
- Occupations: Tailor and Christ impersonator

Arise Evans (or Rhys or Rice Evans; 1607–c.1660) was a Welsh prophet and fanatic.

== Personal history ==
Evans was born about 1607 in Llangelynin parish and was apprenticed to a tailor at Wrexham. While living in Wales, he had seen visions and had prophetic dreams that were accentuated when he went to London in 1629. In London, he made vain efforts to warn King Charles I of perceived dangers but succeeded in telling the Earl of Essex to his face of his future promotions. Evans became interested in the multifarious sects that flourished under the new liberty of Charles I's reign, opposing most of them, especially the tenets of the Fifth Monarchist. He took particular offence towards Christopher Feake and William Aspinwall.

He was arrested and imprisoned in ~1650 at Newgate Prison for impersonating Christ.

== See also ==
- List of people claimed to be Jesus
