= Messiah complex =

Belief that one is a messiah or prophet

The messiah complex is a state of mind in which a person believes they are a messiah or prophet and will save or redeem people in a religious endeavour. The term can also refer to a mental disorder in which an individual believes that they are responsible for saving others. Those with a messiah complex can have either good or bad intentions. Some genuinely wish to help others even at their own expense, while others are motivated by a desire for praise, power or validation of their self-worth.

== Religious delusion ==
The term messiah complex is not addressed in the Diagnostic and Statistical Manual of Mental Disorders (DSM), as it is not a clinical term nor diagnosable disorder. However, the symptoms as a proposed disorder closely resemble those found in individuals with delusions of grandeur or with grandiose self-images that veer towards the delusional. An account specifically identified it as a category of religious delusion, which pertains to strong fixed beliefs that cause distress or disability. It is the type of religious delusion that is classified as grandiose while the other two categories are persecutory and belittled. According to philosopher Antony Flew, an example of this type of delusion was the case of Paul, who declared that God spoke to him, telling him that he would serve as a conduit for people to change. The Kent–Flew thesis argued that his experience entailed auditory and visual hallucinations.

== Examples ==
In terms of the attitude wherein an individual sees themselves as having to save another or a group of poor people, there is the notion that the action inflates their own sense of importance and discounts the skills and abilities of the people they are helping to improve their own lives.

The messiah complex is most often reported in patients with bipolar disorder and schizophrenia. When a messiah complex is manifested within a religious individual after a visit to Jerusalem, it may be identified as a psychosis known as Jerusalem syndrome.

== See also ==
- Cassandra complex
- Chosen people
- False prophet
- Foolishness for Christ
- God complex
- List of avatar claimants
- List of Buddha claimants
- List of Mahdi claimants
- List of messiah claimants
- List of people claimed to be Jesus
- Martyr complex
- Mental health of Jesus
- Messianism
- Religion and schizophrenia
- Religious delusion
- Savior complex
- Superman complex
- White savior
