= List of people who have been considered deities =

This is a list of notable people who were considered deities by themselves or others.

== Imperial cults and cults of personality ==
Who	Image	When	Notability
Pharaohs		3150–30 BCE	Egyptian pharaohs were the kings of Ancient Egypt, and were considered to have divine properties. Their titles equated associated them with aspects of deities, such as the king of the gods Amun and the hawk god Horus. It was standard for Egyptians to worship deceased pharaohs as deities in the form of mortuary cults. However, in rare cases, some pharaohs were deified during their lifetime. See List of pharaohs.
Naram-Sin of Akkad		2255–2119 BCE	The first Mesopotamian emperor who claimed to be a god.
Japanese emperors		??? – 1945	Claimed, at least by some Shintoists, including government officials, to be divine descendants of the goddess Amaterasu. The Shōwa Emperor repudiated the "false conception" of his divinity in the Humanity Declaration in 1945.
Chinese emperors		221 BCE – 1911 CE	Deified as "Sons of Heaven", at least by some Confucianists, since the Qin dynasty under Qin Shi Huang.
Alexander the Great		356–323 BC	To legitimize taking power (in Egypt) and be recognized as the descendant of the long line of pharaohs, Alexander made sacrifices to the gods at Memphis and went to consult the famous oracle of Amun-Ra at the Siwa Oasis in the Libyan desert, at which he was pronounced the son of the deity Amun. Henceforth, Alexander often referred to Zeus-Ammon as his true father; after his death, currency depicted him adorned with horns, using the Horns of Ammon as a symbol of his divinity. The Greeks interpreted this message—one that the gods addressed to all pharaohs—as a prophecy. Some believe he implied he was a demigod by actively using the title "Son of Ammon–Zeus". The title was bestowed upon him by Egyptian priests of the god Ammon at the Oracle of the god at the Siwah oasis in the Libyan Desert.
Natchez rulers		700–1730 CE	The Natchez were a theocracy ruled by "The Great Sun." This ruler has sometimes been deemed a God-king.
Purnawarman		395–434 CE	The king of Sundanese Indianised kingdom called Tarumanagara. According to these inscriptions he embarked on hydraulic project and also identified himself with Vishnu, which indicates he and his kingdom were adhering to the Vishnuite faith.
The Sailendras		7th–11th centuries CE	The Sailendra dynasty of Java were active promoters of Mahayana Buddhism and covered the plains of Central Java with Buddhist monuments, including the world-famous Borobudur.
Majapahit kings		1293–1597	Javanese rulers of South East Asia's largest ever kingdom, in Indonesia. After death, they were depicted as Hindu gods (see for instance Raden Wijaya).
Dalai Lamas		1391–present	Considered re-incarnations of Avalokiteśvara in Tibetan Buddhism. Panchen Lamas are incarnations of Amitābha.
Inca emperors		1438–1533	The Inca Emperors had a status very similar to that of the Pharaohs of Egypt.
Nepalese kings		1768–2008	In Nepal, the kings of the Shah dynasty were considered incarnations of Vishnu.

== Posthumous deification ==
Who	Image	When	Notability
Gilgamesh		Sometime between 2800 and 2500 BCE	Most historians generally agree that Gilgamesh was a historical king of the Sumerian city-state of Uruk, who probably ruled sometime during the early part of the Early Dynastic Period (c. 2900–2350 BCE). It is certain that, during the later Early Dynastic Period, Gilgamesh was worshipped as a god at various locations across Sumer. In the twenty-first century BCE, Utu-hengal, the king of Uruk adopted Gilgamesh as his patron deity. The kings of the Third Dynasty of Ur were especially fond of Gilgamesh, calling him their "divine brother" and "friend". During this period, a large number of myths and legends developed surrounding him. Probably during the Middle Babylonian Period (c. 1600 BCE – c. 1155 BCE), a scribe named Sîn-lēqi-unninni composed the Epic of Gilgamesh, an epic poem written in Akkadian narrating Gilgamesh's heroic exploits. The opening of the poem describes Gilgamesh as "one-third human, two-thirds divine".
Imhotep		c.2625 BCE	Ancient Egyptian architect and physician whose status, two thousand years after his death, was raised to that of a god, becoming the god of medicine and healing. He was an Egyptian chancellor to the pharaoh Djoser, probable architect of the Djoser's step pyramid, and high priest of the sun god Ra at Heliopolis. In Memphis and on the sacred Island of Philae existed temples dedicated to him. The Greeks identified Imhotep with their own divine healer and physician, Asclepios (who also healed people in their dreams).
Heqaib		c.2250 BCE	A nomarch of the first nome of Upper Egypt during the reign of Pepi II Neferkare, who led several successful military expeditions in Nubia.
Ahmose-Nefertari		c.1512 BCE	An Egyptian queen, daughter of Seqenenre Tao and Ahhotep I, Great Royal Wife to Ahmose I, and possibly regent to her son Amenhotep I.
Amenhotep, son of Hapu		c.1356 BCE	An Egyptian architect, priest, herald, scribe, and public official under the reign of Amenhotep III.
Queen Dido of Carthage		814 BCE	Founder and first queen of Carthage, after her death, she was deified by her people with the name of Tanit and assimilated to the Great Goddess Astarte (Roman Juno). The cult of Tanit survived Carthage's destruction by the Romans; it was introduced to Rome itself by Emperor Septimius Severus, himself born in North Africa. It was extinguished completely with the Theodosian decrees of the late 4th century.
Homer		8th century BCE	Venerated at Alexandria by Ptolemy IV Philopator.
Romulus and Remus		771–717 BCE	Founders of Rome, sons of Mars, Romulus served as first king. Romulus was, according to the book History of Rome (written between 27 and 9 BCE by the historian Titus Livius), the son of Rhea Silvia, a Vestal Virgin who became pregnant with the twins Romulus and Remus by the god Mars. After his death, Romulus was deified as the god Quirinus, the divine persona of the Roman people. Romulus' ascension to heaven and deification as god Quirinus is mentioned in Ovid’s poem Metamorphoses, Book 14 (written shortly before 8 AD). Ovid depicts god Jupiter promising Mars the right to translate his son Romulus to immortality. He is now regarded as a mythological figure, and his name a back-formation from the name Rome, which may ultimately derive from a word for "river". Some scholars, notably Andrea Carandini, believe in the historicity of Romulus, in part because of the 1988 discovery of the Murus Romuli on the north slope of the Palatine Hill in Rome.
Pythagoras of Samos		c. 570–495 BCE	Pythagoras was the eponymous founder of the religion of Pythagoreanism. A posthumous legend claimed that Pythagoras was the mortal incarnation of the "Hyperborean Apollo" and that he proved his divinity to Abaris the Hyperborean by showing him his golden thigh.
Hephaestion		356–324 BCE	Deified by Alexander the Great.
Julius Caesar		42 BCE	Deified by the Roman Senate two years after his assassination.
Antinous		111–130 CE	Deified by Hadrian. He is the last non-Imperial human formally deified in Western civilization.
Mary, Mother of Jesus		300 CE	In 300 CE she was purportedly venerated as a Mother Goddess in the alleged Christian sect Collyridianism, which was found throughout Thrace. Collyridianism was made up mostly of women followers and female priests.
Guan Yu		581–618 CE	Guan Yu was deified as early as the Sui dynasty and is still popularly worshipped today among the Chinese people variedly as an indigenous Chinese deity, a dharmapala in Buddhism and a guardian deity in Taoism. He is also held in high esteem in Confucianism. In Hong Kong both police and gangsters consider him a divine object of reverence. In certain schools of Taoism and Chinese Buddhism he has been deemed divine or semi-divine status.
Ali		599–661 CE	According to the Alawite faith, Ali ibn Abi Talib is one member of a trinity (Ali-Muhammad-Salman the Persian) corresponding roughly to the Christian Father, Son, and Holy Spirit. He is considered the second emanation of God by Yarsan and the supreme deity in Ali-Illahism.
Tan Goan-kong		657–711 CE	Also known as Chen Yuanguang, he was a general and official in the Tang dynasty. He was deified and worshipped by the descendants of immigrants from Zhangzhou to Taiwan, Singapore and Malaysia, all refer to him as the "Sacred Duke, Founder of Zhangzhou" (開漳聖王; Kāi Zhāng shèngwáng; Khai Chiang Sèng-ông).
Sugawara no Michizane		845–903 CE	Japanese Imperial courtier banished from the capital and deified upon his death to appease his angry spirit. Worshipped as Tenjin, kami of scholarship.
Lin Moniang		987 CE or later	Fujianese shamaness worshiped as a sea goddess throughout coastal China and the Chinese diaspora community under the name Mazu.
Al-Hakim bi-Amr Allah		985–1021 CE	Sixth Fatimid Caliph in Egypt, ruling from 996 to 1021. The members of the Druze faith believe that the Fatimid Caliph Al-Hakim bi-Amr Allah is the Mahdi. The Muslim scholar and early preacher Nashtakin ad-Darazi claimed that the Caliph was God incarnate. Because of that he was executed by Al-Hakim who did not proclaim that he was God. The Druze today reject Ad-Darazi's preaching completely.
Sundiata Keita		1235–1255 CE	Founder of the Mali empire and great uncle of Mansa Musa. There are several shrines and temples dedicated to his worship that are frequented even in the current day.
Tokugawa Ieyasu		1616	Deified posthumously with the name Tōshō Daigongen by his successors.
Hu Tianbao		17th century	According to What the Master Would Not Discuss (Chinese: 子不語), written by Yuan Mei (Chinese: 袁枚) during the Qing dynasty, Tu'er Shen was a man named Hu Tianbao (胡天保) who fell in love with a very handsome imperial inspector of Fujian Province. One day he was caught peeping on the inspector through a bathroom wall, at which point he confessed his reluctant affections for the other man. The imperial inspector had Hu Tianbao sentenced to death by beating. One month after Hu Tianbao's death, he appeared to a man from his hometown in a dream, claiming that since his crime was one of love, the underworld officials decided to right the injustice by appointing him the god and guardian of homosexual affections.
Xiongdi Gong		1831–1861	108 men from Hainan who were returning home from Vietnam with money earned by them and fellow migrants for their families when they were killed by pirates.
Gauchito Gil		1840s, allegedly 1847	Venerated as a folk saint and deity in Argentina.
George Washington		1865–present	Worshipped as a kami in Hawaiian Shinto shrines. In the United States Capitol dome, he is also depicted ascending into Olympus and becoming a god, in the famous painting called The Apotheosis of Washington.
Kanichi Otsuka		1891–present	Shinreikyo states of its founder "God became one with a human body, appeared among humanity, and founded Shinreikyo."
Maria Franciszka Kozłowska		c. 1924 – present	At least some mariavites believe that God the Father became Mary, God the Son became Jesus and Holy Spirit became Maria Franciszka Kozłowska (1862–1921, an excommunicated Roman Catholic nun from Poland). It is difficult to tell whether she deified herself or has been involuntary deified during her lifetime or posthumously deified. In 1967, Archbishop Maria Rafael Wojciechowski officially testified that in the 1936–1938 period, Archbishop Maria Michał Kowalski had written "Mother said to me that she was present at the creation of the world and that she arranged the world." (for "mother", he used the Polish word "mateczka" which is a diminutive and a title held by Maria Franciszka).
L. L. Zamenhof		20th century–present	Considered a god by members of the Oomoto religion.
José Rizal		20th century–present	Deified by some people in the Philippines due to his contributions to the Philippine Revolution.
Wallace Fard Muhammad		20th century–present	Posthumously (?) deified by Elijah Muhammad. He is also given other titles by the Nation of Islam.
Adolf Hitler		1958–present	Deified by some neo-Nazis most notably among followers of esoteric Nazism. The claim of Hitler's divinity was first made by Savitri Devi in her book The Lightning and the Sun. Devi believed Hitler was avatar of Hindu god Vishnu. Later it was promoted by Chilean neo-Nazi Miguel Serrano.
John Coltrane		1967–1981	After Coltrane's death, a congregation called the Yardbird Temple in San Francisco began worshiping him as God incarnate. The congregation became affiliated with the African Orthodox Church; this involved changing Coltrane's status from a god to a saint. The resultant St. John Coltrane African Orthodox Church, San Francisco, is the only African Orthodox church that incorporates Coltrane's music and his lyrics as prayers in its liturgy.
Pol Pot		1998–present	Worshipped by some Cambodians in Anlong Veng, in particular around his gravesite, where offerings of food are made. In addition, people kneel down near his grave and start praying. There have also been cases of people claiming to have dreamed of Pol Pot and sleepwalked towards his grave.

== Involuntary deification ==
Who	Image	When	Notability
Uzair		?	The Quran said that a group of Jews, often interpreted as the Yemenite Jews, believed "Uzair" was the son of God.^{[Quran 9:30]} It is argued by some that Uzair was Ezra. Ezra established Second Temple Judaism and is regarded as a very important figure in Judaism.
Hayk		2492 BCE	Legendary patriarch and founder of the Armenian nation Revolted against King Bel of Babylon
Antiochus II Theos		286–246 BCE	Seleucid ruler. The younger son of Antiochus I and Stratonice, succeeded his father in 261. He liberated Ephesus, Ionia, Cilicia and Pamphylia from Egyptian domination, and in return for their autonomy the cities of Asia Minor gave him the title Theos ("God").
Paul the Apostle and Barnabas		Autumn 49 CE	According to a story recorded in the Book of Acts 14:8–18, the apostle Paul and his companion Barnabas healed a crippled man in the street in the town of Lystra in Asia Minor, during Paul's second missionary journey. The townsfolk immediately mistook them for the Greek gods Hermes and Zeus respectively and attempted to offer sacrifices to them.
Master Qing Shui		1047–1101	Chan Buddhist monk during the Northern Song in Anxi County, Quanzhou. He is said to have saved the town of Anxi during a period of drought, bringing rain as he went from place to place. In reverence, the villagers built temples dedicated to him and hence became a Deity in Chinese folk religion.
Zheng He		1371–1433	Worshipped by some Chinese and South East Asians.
Kumari		~17th century–present	These are little girls who are worshipped by both Hindus and Buddhists as the incarnation of the Hindu Goddess Durga (Nepali Taleju) in Nepal. They are picked when they are prepubescent and are worshipped until they reach puberty. Their cult is in South Asian countries, especially in Nepal.
John Nicholson	Brigadier-General John Nicholson	19th century–present	Inspired the cult of Nikal Seyn.
Jiddu Krishnamurti		1909–present	Renounced the status of messiah and Maitreya incarnation given him by the Theosophical Society.
Haile Selassie I		1930s–present	Among most followers of the Rastafari movement, Haile Selassie is seen as the second coming of Jesus Christ, God incarnate, the Black Messiah and "Earth's Rightful Ruler" who will also lead African peoples to freedom. Rastas say that his imperial titles (i.e. King of Kings, Conquering Lion of the Tribe of Judah, and Root of David) were prophesied as belonging to the returned Messiah in Revelation 5:5. Their faith in his divinity first appeared in Jamaica, soon after his 1930 coronation in Addis Ababa. Before his coronation he was called Ras (meaning Prince) Tafari.
Mary Baker Eddy		1947–present	Founder of Christian Science, Eddy was first deified with the private publication of The Destiny of The Mother Church by Bliss Knapp. Although the book is distributed in Christian Science reading rooms, it is not considered authorised literature, and Eddy herself denied any comparison to Jesus and allegations of her being the Second Christ.
Prince Philip, Duke of Edinburgh		1950s~1960s–present	Considered a god in the village of Yaohnanen, a cargo cult in Vanuatu. See Prince Philip movement.
Douglas MacArthur		later 20th century	Honored for his role in the Battle of Inchon, a few followers of Korean shamanism venerated him as a deity around his statue at Jayu Park.
Rabbi Menachem Mendel Schneerson		1990s–present	While considered the messiah by most of his followers following his death in 1994, one group has deified him.
Raj Patel		2010–present	In January 2010 some adherents of Share International, following an announcement by Benjamin Creme, concluded that Patel could be the Maitreya. Patel has denied being the Maitreya.

== Self-deification ==
Who	Image	When	Notability
Naram-Sin		2255–2119 BCE	The first Mesopotamian king to claim divinity. He marked himself with the dingir symbol, a determinative for a divinity. After him, his son Shar-Kali-Sharri and then later Mesopotamian Kings would carry the tradition onwards. These kings included Shulgi, Amar-Sin, Shu-Sîn, and Ibbi-Sîn of the Third Dynasty of Ur; Shu-Ilishu, Iddin-Dagan, Ishme-Dagan, Lipit-Ishtar, Ur-Ninurta, Būr-Sîn, Lipit-Enlil, Erra-imitti, Enlil-bani, Zambiya, Iter-pûsha, Ur-dukuga, Sîn-magir, Damiq-ilishu of the Isin dynasty; and Rim-Sîn I and Rim-Sîn II of the Larsa dynasty.
Shulgi	Portraits of Shulgi from his Nuska seal.	2037–2028 BCE	Brought back self-deification during the Ur III Period.
Amar-Sin		2046–2037 BCE	Succeeded Shulgi
Shu-Sin	Seal of Shu-Sin: "Shu-sin, the Great King, King of Ur, King of the four world quarters..."	2037–2028 BCE	Built Temples for himself.
Empedocles of Acragas		c. 490 – c. 430 BCE	Empedocles of Acragas was a Pre-Socratic philosopher from the island of Sicily, who, in one of his surviving poems, declares himself to have become a "divine being... no longer mortal", followed by descriptions of him performing activities normally reserved for the gods. The later historian Diogenes Laërtius claimed that Empedocles committed suicide by jumping into Mount Etna in order to persuade people that he was an immortal god, a legend which is also alluded to by the Roman poet Horace.
Pharnavaz I of Iberia		326–234 BCE	Iberian king (r. 299–234 BCE)
Antiochus IV Epiphanes		215–164 BCE	Seleucid ruler (r. 175–164); the only Seleucid king to claim divine honors, calling himself Theos Epiphaneus "God Manifest" and Nikephoros "Bringer of Victory." Nearly conquered Ptolemaic Egypt, the primary rival of the Seleucids among the Diadochi states. Famously attempted to impose ancient Greek religion on the Jews by persecution, leading to the Maccabean Revolt; remembered as a major persecutor in Jewish tradition.
Antiochus I		c. 86 BCE–38 BCE	King of Commagene who instituted a cult for himself and several syncretistic Graeco-Persian deities at Mount Nemrud and elsewhere.
Simon Magus		1st–4th century	Considered a god in Simonianism. According to Irenaeus, he "was glorified by many as if he were a god; and he taught that it was himself who appeared among the Jews as the Son, but descended in Samaria as the Father while he came to other nations in the character of the Holy Spirit. He represented himself, in a word, as being the loftiest of all powers, that is, the Being who is the Father over all, and he allowed himself to be called by whatsoever title men were pleased to address him."
Veleda		1st century	Germanic prophetess considered a deity during her lifetime.
Sheikh Adi ibn Musafir		12th century	Mystic and ascetic who settled at Lalish and is the central saint of Yazidism. Poems attributed to him, preserved in the oldest surviving Yazidi manuscripts (13th century), express a pantheistic self-identification as God, including the line "In the secret of my knowledge there is no God but me." Yazidis venerate him as one of the three principal manifestations of God alongside Sultan Ezid and Tawûsî Melek.
Ismail I		16th century	Self-claimed to be an emanation of God and was considered such by the Qizilbash-Safavid order, Qizilbash-Turkman subjects and Alevis.
Danila Filippovich		1700	He believed that he was God and started the Khlysts. (There are various transliterations of his name including Danila Filipov, Danila Filipich, and Daniil Filippovich.)
Kondratii Selivanov		1780s	Kondraty Selivanov proclaimed himself both as the late Peter III of Russia and Christ himself, and started the Skoptsy.
Hong Xiuquan		19th century	Chinese man who claimed he was the younger brother of Jesus, and thus a son of God. Led the Taiping Rebellion, conquering a large part of China before defeat and suicide.
Dios Buhawi		~1887	Philippine shaman who called himself "God Whirlwind."
Father Divine		~20th century	His followers considered him God in the flesh.
Taher Saifuddin		20th century	Claimed to be Ilah'ul-Ard (God on Earth) in Bombay High Court.
Lou de Palingboer		20th century	A divorced Dutchman named Louwrens Voorthuijzen who proclaimed himself "Lou the Eel Vendor", this being the translation of his proclaimed name "Lou de Palingboer". He was a figure who mixed marketing European eels with proselytism. His followers also considered him a living God on a mission against evil.
Jehovah Wanyonyi		21st century	"I am the one who created Adam and Eve. I made their bodies and their blood", [...] "I still use human beings by speaking through them, like I spoke through Jesus Christ until he went to Heaven." There are between 120 and 1000 followers who consider him to be God.
Sathya Sai Baba		20th century	Hindu guru that followers believed was a reincarnation of an avatar of Dattatreya. He alleged that he had the ability to heal, raise the dead, appear in more than one location at the same time, materialize objects, such as jewellery, etc.
Yahweh ben Yahweh		20th century	He was born as Hulon Mitchell, Jr. and his self-proclaimed name means "God, Son of God." He could have only been deeming himself son of God, not God, but many of his followers clearly consider him God Incarnate.
Mitsuo Matayoshi		20th century	In 1997 he established the World Economic Community Party (世界経済共同体党) based on his conviction that he is the God and Christ.
Meher Baba		~1930	An Indian spiritual master who said he was the Avatar, God in human form.
Mita		~1940	According to the Mita faith, Mita (Peraza) was the incarnation of the Holy Ghost on earth.
Jim Jones		1955	Founder of Peoples Temple, which started off as a part of a mainstream Protestant denomination before becoming a personality cult as time went on. One of Jones's devotees claimed that Jones said "If you see me as your savior, I'll be your savior. If you see me as your God, I'll be your God"; however Jones also described himself as atheist.
Vissarion		1961	Claims to be Jesus Christ returned, which, he says, makes him not "God" but the "word of God".
François Duvalier		1960s–1970s	Haitian Dictator claimed that he was the physical embodiment of the island nation. Duvalier deliberately modeled his image on that of Baron Samedi, one of the lwa, or spirits, of Haitian Vodou. He often donned sunglasses in order to hide his eyes and talked with the strong nasal tone associated with the lwa. The regime's propaganda stated that "Papa Doc was one with the lwa, Jesus Christ and God himself". The most celebrated image from the time shows a standing Jesus Christ with a hand on the shoulder of a seated Papa Doc, captioned, "I have chosen him". Duvalier declared himself an "immaterial being" as well as "the Haitian flag" soon after his first election. In 1964, he published a catechism in which the Lord's Prayer was reworded to pay tribute to Duvalier instead of God.
Nirmala Srivastava		1970	Guru and goddess of Sahaja Yoga, has proclaimed herself the incarnation of the Holy Ghost (Adi Shakti), claimed that all other incarnations (e.g., Krishna, Christ, etc.) were aspects of her.
Francisco Macías Nguema		1970s	His party used the slogan, (officially decreed by him in 1974): "There is no other God than Macias". Catholic clergy were also required to preach that "God created Equatorial Guinea thanks to Macias."
Apollo Quiboloy		1985	Calls himself as the "Appointed Son of God" in his own Restorationist church called the Kingdom of Jesus Christ.
Ayah Pin		1980's-2010's	Founder of the Sky Kingdom cult, he claimed to have direct contact with the heavens. Claiming to be the reincarnation of Jesus, The Buddha, Shiva, and prophet Muhammad, he was regarded as the king of the sky and the supreme object of devotion for all religions. His teachings attract followers ranging from approximately 23 to 22,800 individuals.
Joseph Kony		1987	Proclaims himself the spokesperson of God and a spirit medium, and has been considered by some as a cult of personality, and claims he is visited by a multinational host of 13 spirits, including a Chinese phantom.
Ryuho Okawa		1986	Founder of Happy Science, worshipped by his followers as 'El Cantare' and a reincarnation of Elohim, Odin, Thoth, Osiris, and Buddha.
Amy Carlson		c. 2006 – 2021	Founder of Love Has Won. Proclaimed herself to be God, as well as Jesus, several secular historical figures, St. Joan of Arc, and the Indigenous Hawaiian goddess Pele. Followers call her "Momma God" and were found to have mummified her in order to continue to worship her.
Kanye West, a.k.a. Ye		c. 2010 – present	Has declared himself God and a deity on multiple occasions in songs and interviews since at least 2013.

== Controversial deification ==
Who	Image	When	Notability
Jesus		Early Christianity–present	Further information: History of early Christianity and Divinity of Jesus There is debate whether Jesus claimed to be divine, or whether divinity was attributed to him progressively by his followers. According to Bart D. Ehrman Jesus did not make public claims of divinity. In the first three centuries of the Christian movement, Jesus' identity and relation to God were often subjects of debate and controversy, and the belief among Christians that Jesus was not divine was common. Even early Christians who believed that Jesus was God often meant different things by it. During one such controversy, the First Council of Nicaea of 325 AD crystallized the notion in the Nicene Creed that Jesus was God Incarnate, and he is now considered divine in most Christian views of Jesus.

== See also ==
- Advaita Vedanta
- Apotheosis
- Arahitogami
- Brahman
- Christ myth theory
- Cult of personality
- Culture hero
- Divinity#Mortal
- Divinization (Christian)
- Euhemerism
- Folk saint
- God complex
- God in Hinduism
- Godman (Hindu ascetic)
- Hero cult
- Idolatry
- Imperial cult
- Incarnation
- List of avatar claimants
- List of Buddha claimants
- List of deities
- List of demigods
- List of Mahdi claimants
- List of messiah claimants
- List of people claimed to be Jesus
- List of pharaohs deified during lifetime
- Mahāvākyas
- Maitreya claimants
- Messiah complex
- Religion in ancient Rome
- Sacred king
- Shaktyavesha Avatar
- Tat Tvam Asi
- "Thou Art God"
- Veneration of the dead
- Worship of the living
