= List of pharaohs deified during lifetime =

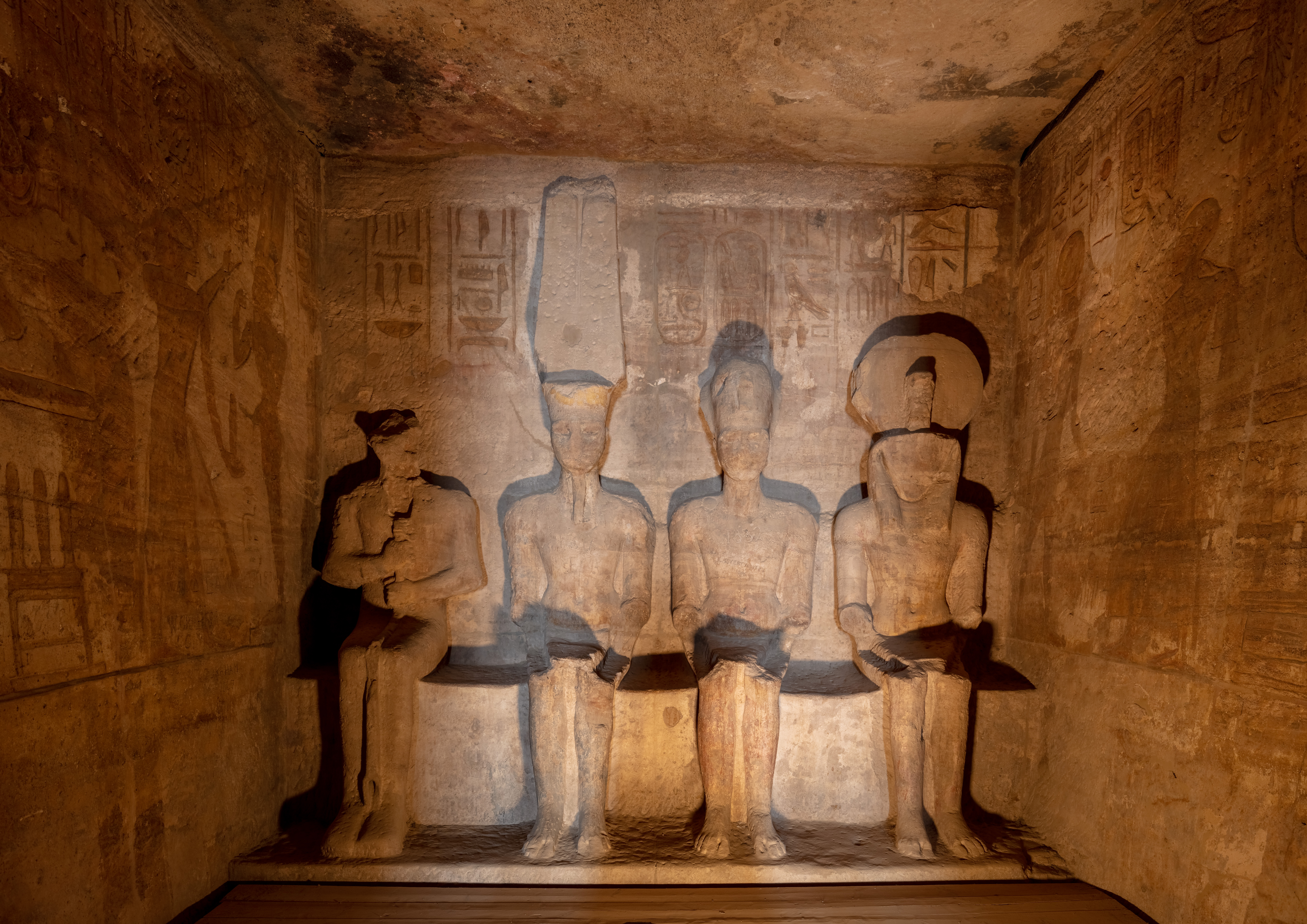
Temple of Ramesses II at Abu Simbel, Egypt depicting, from right to left, the god Ra-Horakhty, the deified form of Ramesses II, and the gods Amun Ra and Ptah

In religiology and Egyptology, the living deification of pharaohs refers to the establishment of formal, theocratic cultic venerations directed toward a reigning ancient Egyptian pharaoh as a living deity within the ancient Egyptian religious pantheon of gods, thereby achieving deification status before death. The phenomenon was exceptionally rare, as in accordance with ancient Egyptian religious tradition, it was standard for pharaohs to be worshipped exclusively posthumously as transfigured beings amongst other deceased royal ancestors. This was generally performed in the form of an organized mortuary cult.

In accordance with ordinary imperial cult government, during a pharaoh's lifetime, they were generally recognized as having some divine properties. However, it was extremely rare for a pharaoh to establish a cultic devotion of worshippers during the pharaoh's lifetime. These followers of the pharaoh regarded the pharaoh’s divine status as equivalent to that of a true deity. Amongst the indigenous ancient Egyptian dynasties, this was resultant of a successful self-deification attempt usually substantiated by military accomplishment. Pharaoh Amenhotep III is the exception to this military substantiation custom, as his deification was substantiated via peaceful political leadership. Half of these indigenous ancient Egyptian pharaohs also co-deified their wife during her lifetime, first instituted by Amenhotep III. However, this spousal co-deification was normalized in the Ptolemaic dynasties.

== Pharaohs deified during their lifetime ==
A few pharaohs have been confirmed to have been honored with cultic worship as deities during their lifetime. Ptolemaic pharaohs were also deified during their lifetime, although the theological context is different from that of the pharaonic era deifications. In Pharaonic Egypt, for a pharaoh to have a cultic devotion during their lifetime was a form of earned exaltation of status. These cults differed in nature from cults of personality and political cults in that they were strictly meritocratic.

In Ancient Egypt, a military soldier had the opportunity to boost their status and rank within the military by demonstrating valiance in battle. This capacity for career upward mobility was also practiced in other ancient Egyptian professions such as amongst scribes. Pharaoh deification during lifetime as a form of elevated status beyond the ordinary pharaoh status, can be conceptualized as akin to a pharaoh analog of this upward mobility capacity.

Egyptologist Karen Byrson writes:

"Any king could expect to be venerated among the royal ancestors and as a transfigured being after death. Some, however, became the object of more intense and specialized worship in life"

This deification is analogous to how for ancient Egyptian nonroyals, to be posthumously deified was a form of honorific exaltation, as nonroyals were generally not posthumously deified. Out of the hundreds of pharaohs of the indigenous ancient Egypt dynasties, four are confirmed to have been deified during their lifetime (statistical rarity no more than approximately 2%). All four cults had established worship occurring at Nubia, not just in Egypt.

Pharaohs deified during their lifetime
Pharaoh	Dynasty	Reigned	Deification	Spouse deified	Associated deity
Pharaonic Egypt
Senusret III	12th Dynasty	1878 BC – 1839 BC	Senusret III was deified during his lifetime as a god in his own right, due to his military achievements. This was especially done in Nubia, where he led four victorious military campaigns. He was traditionally likened to the warrior goddess Sekhmet, the ancient Egyptian deity most associated with war. Hymns identify him as he "who shoots the arrow like Sekhmet, when he overthrows thousands who ignore his power".	No	Sekhmet
Amenhotep III	18th Dynasty	1388 BC – 1351 BC	Amenhotep III initiated his own self-deification at his first sed festival around year 30 of his reign primarily as the dazzling Aten. He was not a warrior pharaoh, known to only have participated in one military campaign. Alternatively, under his political leadership, Egypt reached a golden age of peace and prosperity. Amenhotep III concurrently deified his wife, Queen Tiye, who was associated with the goddess Hathor.	Yes	Aten
Tutankhamun	18th Dynasty	1332 BC – 1323 BC	Tutankhamun deified himself during his lifetime as the incarnation of the god Amun. Military performance contributed to the substantiation of the deification, especially against ancient Nubia. Also, the Stela of Huy equates Tutankhamun's divinity with that of the god Amun.	No	Amun
Ramesses II	19th Dynasty	1279 BC – 1213 BC	Ramesses II deified himself during his lifetime as the god Amun, his favorite god, while retaining his own personal identity, primarily for his military campaigns and diplomatic successes. For example, Stele Aksha 505 describes how Ramesses II's status in the army was divine. Ramesses II concurrently deified his wife, Queen Nefertari.	Yes	Amun
Ptolemaic Kingdom
Ptolemaic rulers	Ptolemaic Dynasty	309 BC – 30 BC	The Ptolemaic Dynasty had its own distinct imperial cult theologically founded upon Alexander the Great, who was posthumously deified in ancient Egypt. As the Ptolemaic Dynasty progressed, its dynastic cult eventually led to the rulers' self-deification and worship as deities during the rulers' lifetime. In this dynastic cult, it was generally standardized for couples to be co-deified during their lifetime. Historian Tara L. Sewell-Lasater stated : "Ptolemy I founded the dynasty and established the basis of the dynastic cult, which was based on his association with the divinity of Alexander the Great. Ptolemy II would continue developing the legitimization scheme of the dynasty by implementing a practice of incest as a method of associating the Ptolemies with the gods and reinforcing the dynastic cult. Ptolemy III established the precedent of deification while the monarchs were a living couple, and he implemented the worship of preceding sovereigns." The tradition continued through to the famous ruler Cleopatra, who had herself deified, and was herself was a descendant of Ptolemy I, nine generations apart. It lasted until the end of the reign of the Ptolemaic dynasty's last sovereign ruler Ptolemy XV Caesar.	Yes (standard)	Various deities

=== Pharaonic era cult comparison ===
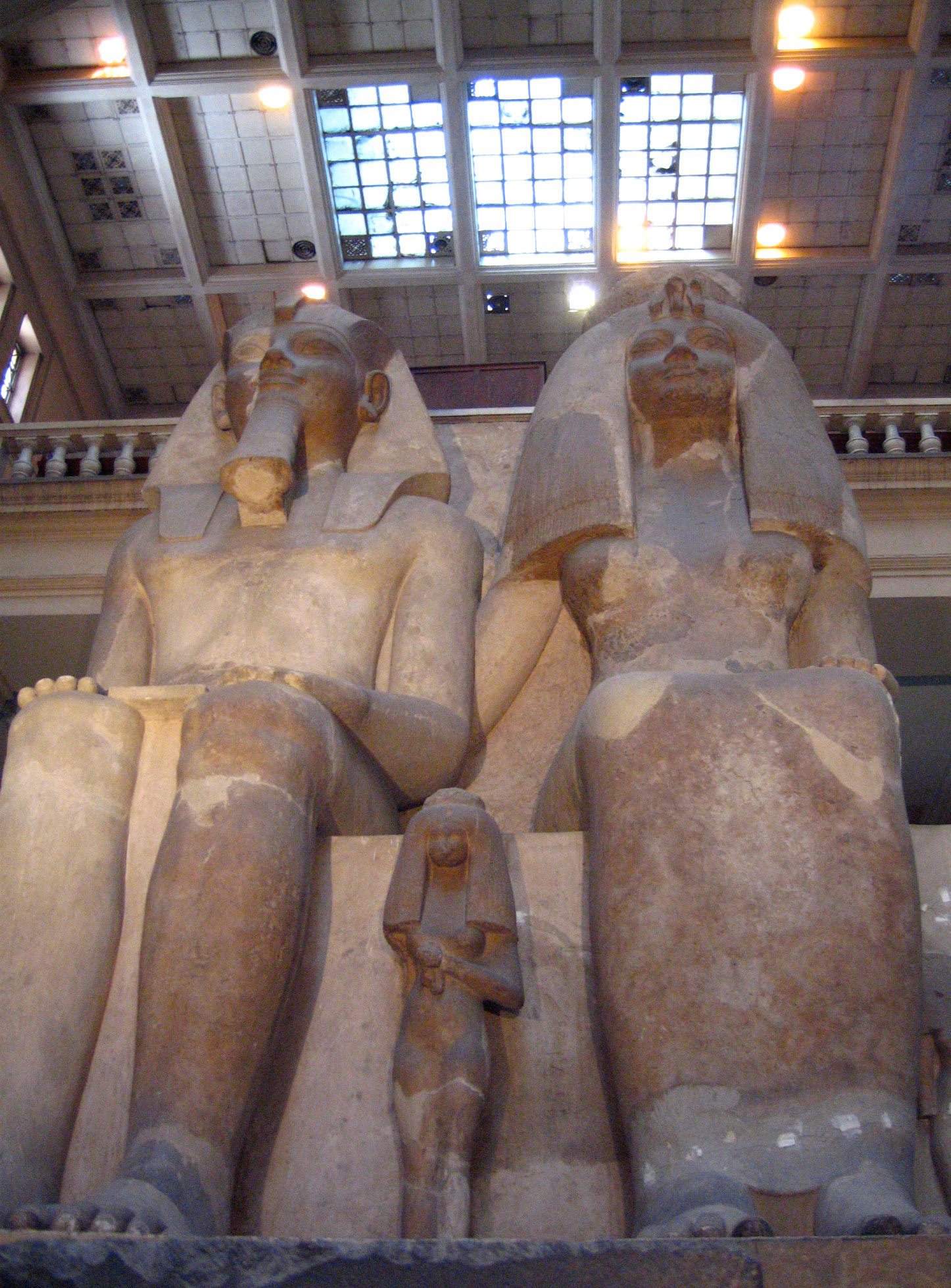
A colossal statue of Amenhotep III and Queen Tiye, built after his first sed festival and subsequent self-deification of himself and his wife.

In overview, aside from Senusret III, all confirmed cultic devotion to deified forms of indigenous ancient Egyptian pharaohs occurred within relative chronological proximity to each other. Similarities of those cults has been noted by scholars. Egyptologist Lanny Bell wrote that:

"It is known that both Tutankhamun and Ramesses II patterned their own cults after Amenhotep III in Nubia"

However, as summarized in the table, a key difference between the cult of Amenhotep III and the Tutankhamun and Ramesses II cults is that Amenhotep III strictly substantiated his cult on political leadership as opposed to military performance.

Pharaohs Ramesses II and Tutankhamun are the only pharaohs defied during their lifetime associated with the same deity, Amun. However, the deification of Ramesses II did incorporation an equation of himself as Amun, unlike in Tutankhamun's deification, but rather Ramesses II identified himself as a distinct person in Amun's likeness. Ramesses II is also the only pharaoh of nonroyal birth to be deified during their lifetime. Meanwhile, Tutankhamun was the last pharaoh of royal birth prior to this, and was the last pharaoh of royal birth to be deified during their lifetime until the Ptolemaic dynasty.

Senusret III is the only of these pharaohs to be associated with a deity of a gender nonidentical to his own. The warrior goddess Sekhmet, is known to have masculine qualities. Senusret III's association with Sekhmet may represent his gender fluidity. It is also noteworthy that only Senusret III's cult and Tutankhamun's cult have no evidence of co-deification of their respective spouses, while Amenhotep III's cult, Ramesses II's, and the Ptolemaic cults did.

==== Associated deity theological comparison ====
The cult of Tutankhamun, which equated Tutankhamun with the local incarnation of the god Amun was a particularly high status deity association, as Amun was considered the most important of the gods, and alone regarded as the king of the gods. Relatedly, the cult of Ramesses II, which associated him with Amun while still retaining his own distinct personhood, is also similarly a relatively high status deity association.

The cult of Senusret III, which associated him with Sekhmet while he was deified in his own personhood, is a high status deity association, yet not as high status as Amun.

The deity association of Amenhotep III was more theologically nuanced, as his deification program identified him personally as the Aten, which is literally the visible solar disk, the image of the solar deity, Ra. Egyptologist Raymond Johnson writes that during Amenhotep III's last decade:

"He was officially considered to be a living manifestation of the creator god Re, particularly in his manifestation as the sun's disk, Aten, and hence was a living embodiment of all the gods of Egypt, their 'living image' on earth."

The Aten deity alone, was a lower status god, compared to other gods. The theological caveat of Amenhotep III's deification was that he was recognized as the living image of Ra-Horakhty, a fusion god Ra and Horus, but as a manifestation of this god as the Aten. In this regard, the deity association of Amenhotep III is more akin in status to the deification of Senusret III as himself while concurrently associated with Sekhmet.

=== Other pharaohs investigated for during-lifetime deification ===
Because deification during a pharaoh's lifetime increases a leader's power, especially within their royal circle, it was sought after. Various pharaohs attempted self-deification during their lifetime, but not every attempt was successful. There is some evidence or speculation that other pharaohs were deified during their lifetimes.

Other pharaohs investigated for during-lifetime deification
Pharaoh	Dynasty	Reigned	Deification
Pharaonic Egypt
Mentuhotep II	11th Dynasty	2060 BC – 2009 BC	It has been stipulated that Mentuhotep II was deified during his lifetime, but this is disputed.
Amenemhat III	12th Dynasty	1839 BC – c.1786 BC	There is some evidence Amenemhat III attempted self-deification during his lifetime, but success of this attempt has not be conferred.
Akhenaten	18th Dynasty	1351 BC – 1334 BC	Akhenaten attempted to deify himself during his Atenism religiopolitical upheaval, although the success of this attempt has not been conferred.
Horemheb	18th Dynasty	1319 BC – 1292 BC	There is some evidence Horemheb attempted self-deification during his lifetime, although this is disputed.

There is a pattern in that of the pharaohs whom attempted self-deification during their lifetime, the majority of them are successors to a pharaoh who successfully accomplished self-deification during their lifetime: Amenemhat III was the successor to Senusret III via coregency, Akhenaten was the successor to Amenhotep III, and Horemheb was the successor (barring Ay's Iry-pat interception interregnum) to Tutankhamun.

==== Atenism & Amenhotep III cult ====
An important note about Akhenaten's self-deification program is that it was theologically connected to Amenhotep III's during-lifetime deification. Egyptologists David O'Connor and Eric H. Cline have examined the relationship between Amenhotep III's cult and Akhenaten's Atenism, concluding that the influence of the former on the latter is unquestionable. Further, they argue that the former laid the religiopolitical and theological foundations for the latter, proposing:

Akhenaten's famous sun cult might have actually been an extraordinary part of his father's deification program, and that the deified Amenhotep III and Akhenaten's new sun god, the Living Aten, were one and the same god.

In this regard, Akehnaten's Atenism can be characterized as the culmination of his father, Amenhotep III's, deification program. Also, evidence indicates the Atenism revolution was already set in motion prior to Amenhotep III's death, as some inscriptions from his mortuary temple, which was constructed before his death, mention only the god Aten without mention of other gods. This is unusual for a pharaoh.

== See also ==
- List of people who have been considered deities
- Table of prophets of Abrahamic religions
- Lists of saints
- List of child saints
- List of deities
- List of war deities
- List of angels in theology
- List of theological demons
- Saint
- Military saint
- Secular saint
- God's Wife of Amun
- Clergy of ancient Egypt
- High Priest of Amun
- Egotheism
- Apotheosis
- Cult of personality
- Culture hero
- Euhemerism
- Folk saint
- God complex
- Hero cult
- Idolatry
- Precedent
- List of demigods
- Sacred king
- Veneration of the dead
- Theocracy
- Amenhotep, son of Hapu
- Ahmose-Nefertari
- Heqaib
- Djedefhor
- Ptahhotep
- Kagemni I
- Moses and Monotheism
- Religious war
- Osarseph
- Kumari
- Arahitogami
- Worship of the living
- State Shinto
- Religious literacy
