= Arecibo barrio-pueblo =

Historical and administrative center (seat) of Arecibo, Puerto Rico

Arecibo barrio-pueblo Pueblo de Arecibo
- Municipality Seat
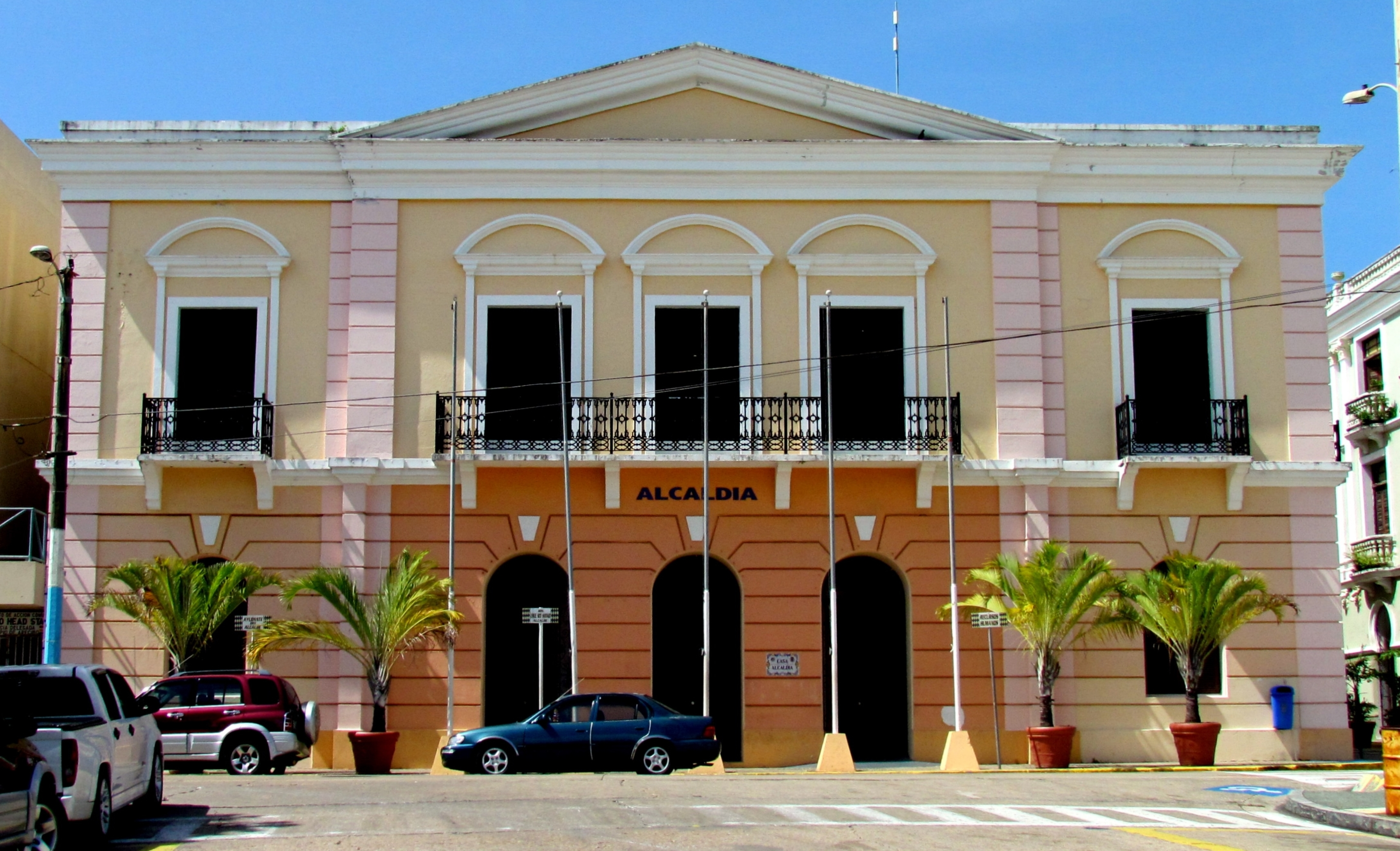
- Town Hall in Arecibo

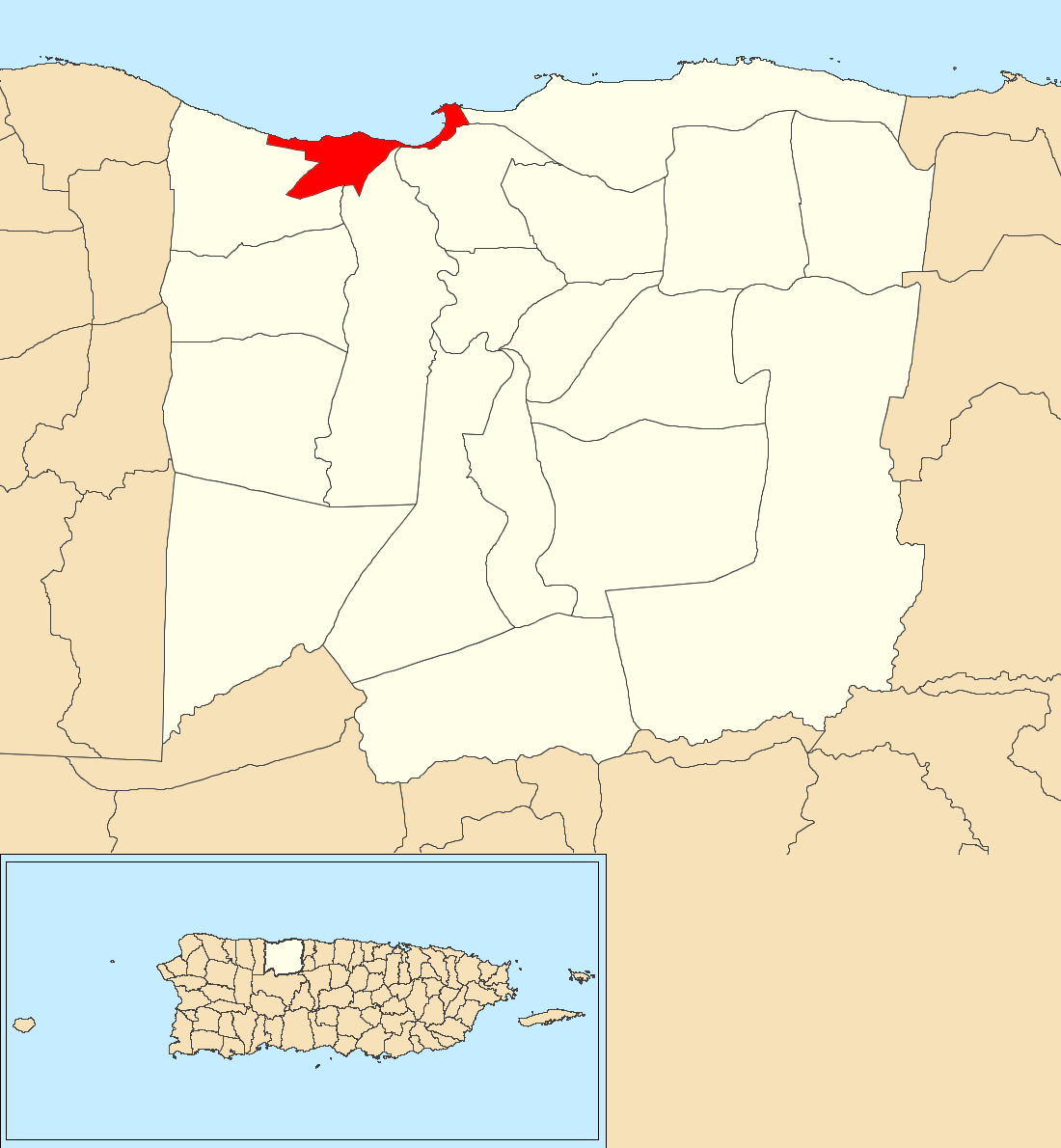
- Location of Arecibo barrio-pueblo within the municipality of Arecibo shown in red

- Location of Puerto Rico
- Coordinates: 18°28′23″N 66°43′13″W
- Commonwealth: Puerto Rico
- Municipality: Arecibo

Area
  - Total: 2.62 sq mi (6.8 km^{2})
  - Land: 1.41 sq mi (3.7 km^{2})
  - Water: 1.21 sq mi (3.1 km^{2})
- Elevation: 23 ft (7.0 m)

Population (2010)
  - Total: 8,488
  - Density: 5,935.7/sq mi (2,291.8/km^{2})
- Source: 2010 Census
- Time zone: UTC−4 (AST)

Arecibo barrio-pueblo is a barrio and downtown area that serves as the administrative center (seat) of Arecibo, a municipality of Puerto Rico. Its population in 2010 was 8,488.

As was customary in Spain, in Puerto Rico, the municipality has a barrio called pueblo which contains a central plaza, the municipal buildings (city hall), and a Catholic church. Fiestas patronales (patron saint festivals) are held in the central plaza every year.

== The central plaza and its church ==
The central plaza, or square, is a place for official and unofficial recreational events and a place where people can gather and socialize from dusk to dawn. The Laws of the Indies, Spanish law, which regulated life in Puerto Rico in the early 19th century, stated the plaza's purpose was for "the parties" (celebrations, festivities) (Spanish: a propósito para las fiestas), and that the square should be proportionally large enough for the number of neighbors (Spanish: grandeza proporcionada al número de vecinos). These Spanish regulations also stated that the streets nearby should be comfortable portals for passersby, protecting them from the elements: sun and rain.

Located across from the central plaza in Arecibo barrio-pueblo is the Catedral San Felipe Apostól, the second-largest Roman Catholic church in Puerto Rico. It was built in 1616, then reconstructed in 1793. After the ceiling of the central nave was damaged by the 1918 San Fermín earthquake it was reconstructed in concrete.

The central plaza features an obelisk which sometimes has been decorated as a Christmas tree during the holiday.

== History ==
Arecibo barrio-pueblo was in Spain's gazetteers until Puerto Rico was ceded by Spain in the aftermath of the Spanish–American War under the terms of the Treaty of Paris of 1898 and became an unincorporated territory of the United States. In 1899, the United States Department of War conducted a census of Puerto Rico finding that the population of Arecibo Pueblo was 8,008.

Historical population
Census	Pop.	Note	%±
1900	8,008		—
1910	9,612		20.0%
1920	10,039		4.4%
1930	12,863		28.1%
1940	22,134		72.1%
1950	28,659		29.5%
1960	28,828		0.6%
1970	0		−100.0%
1980	14,279		—
1990	11,954		−16.3%
2000	10,596		−11.4%
2010	8,488		−19.9%
U.S. Decennial Census; 1899 (shown as 1900) 1910-1930; 1930-1950 1980-2000 2010

Casa de la Diosa Mita (The House of Goddess Mita), a house listed on the National Register of Historic Places, is located in Arecibo barrio-pueblo. It was the home where Juanita "Mita" García Peraza started the Mita Congregation.

== Sectors ==
Barrios (which are, in contemporary times, roughly comparable to minor civil divisions) in turn are further subdivided into smaller local populated place areas/units called sectores (sectors in English). The types of sectores may vary, from normally sector to urbanización to reparto to barriada to residencial, among others.

The following sectors are in Arecibo barrio-pueblo:

Avenida 65 de Infantería, Avenida Constitución, Avenida Cotto, Avenida San Luis, Calle Los Héroes, Calles: Ledesma, Cruz Roja, Caribe, Avenida Miramar, Comunidad Barrio Obrero, Comunidad La Múcura, Condominios del Atlántico, Reparto Cotto Viejo, Reparto Marquez, Reparto San Juan, Residencial Bella Vista, Residencial Extensión Zeno Gandía, Residencial Ramón Marín, Residencial Trina Padilla, Urbanización Centro Urbano, Urbanización Radioville, and Urbanización Zeno Gandía.

== Gallery ==
Places in Arecibo barrio-pueblo:

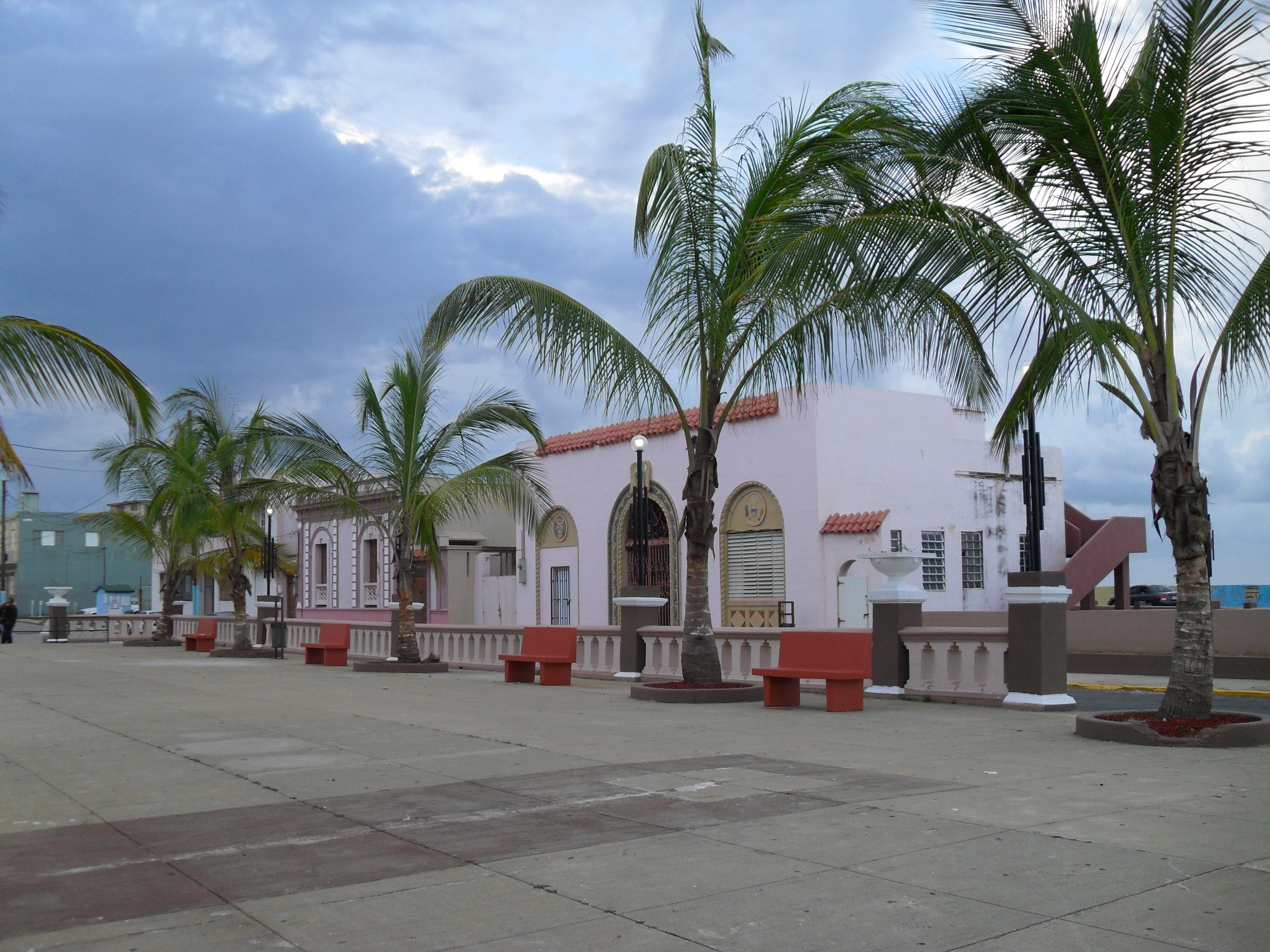
Plaza Colon

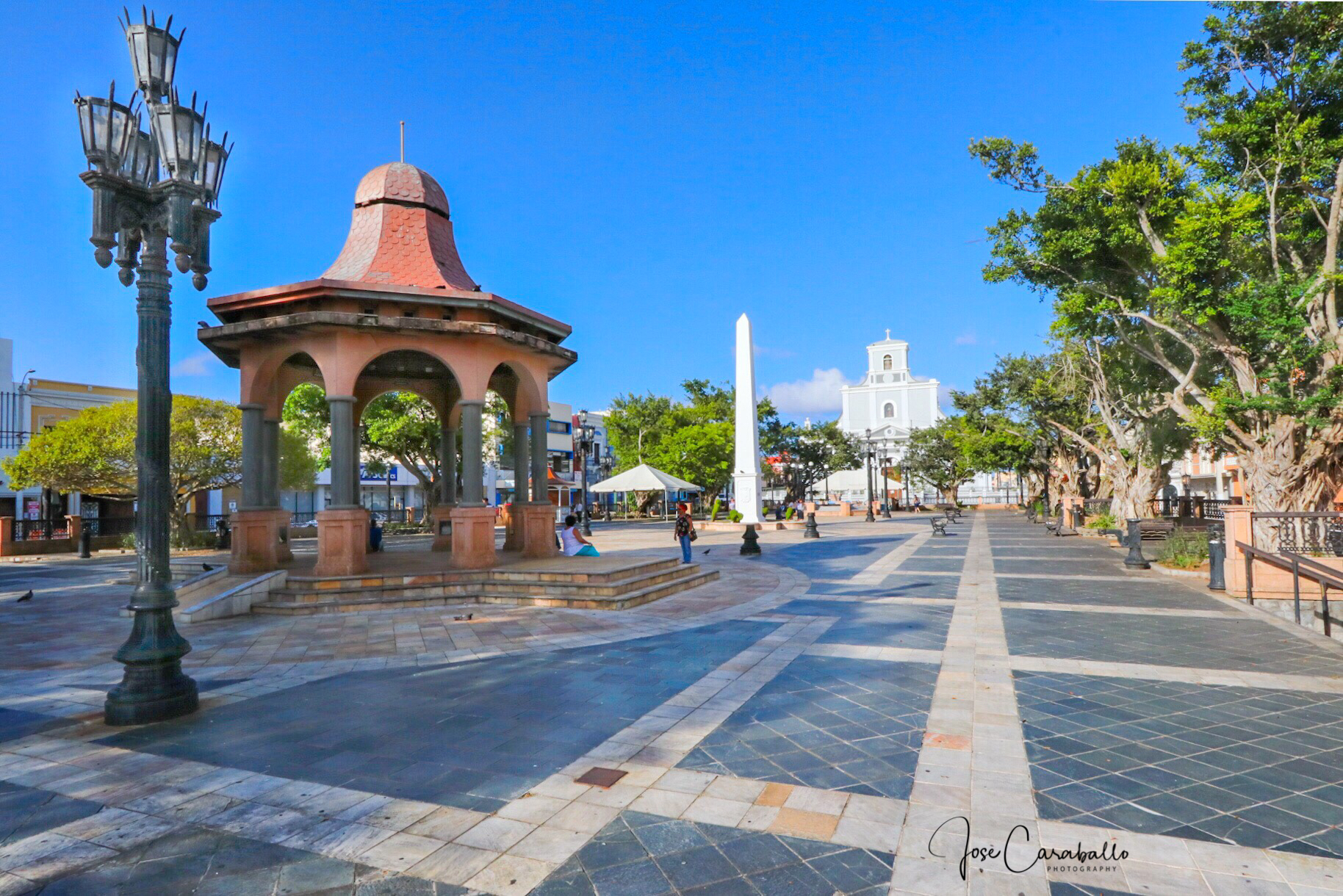
Square

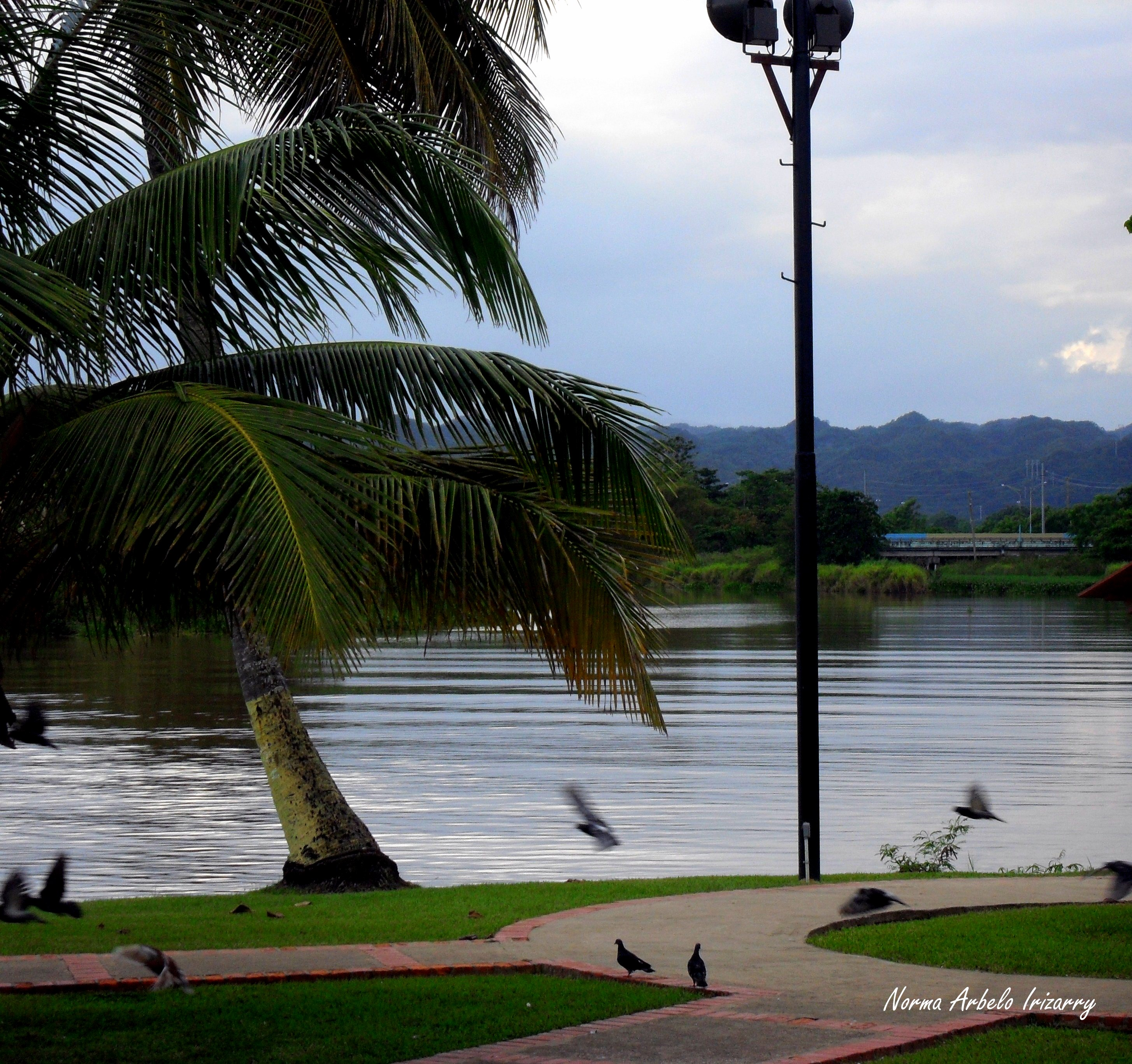
Passive park Parque Doctor Rivera Aulet

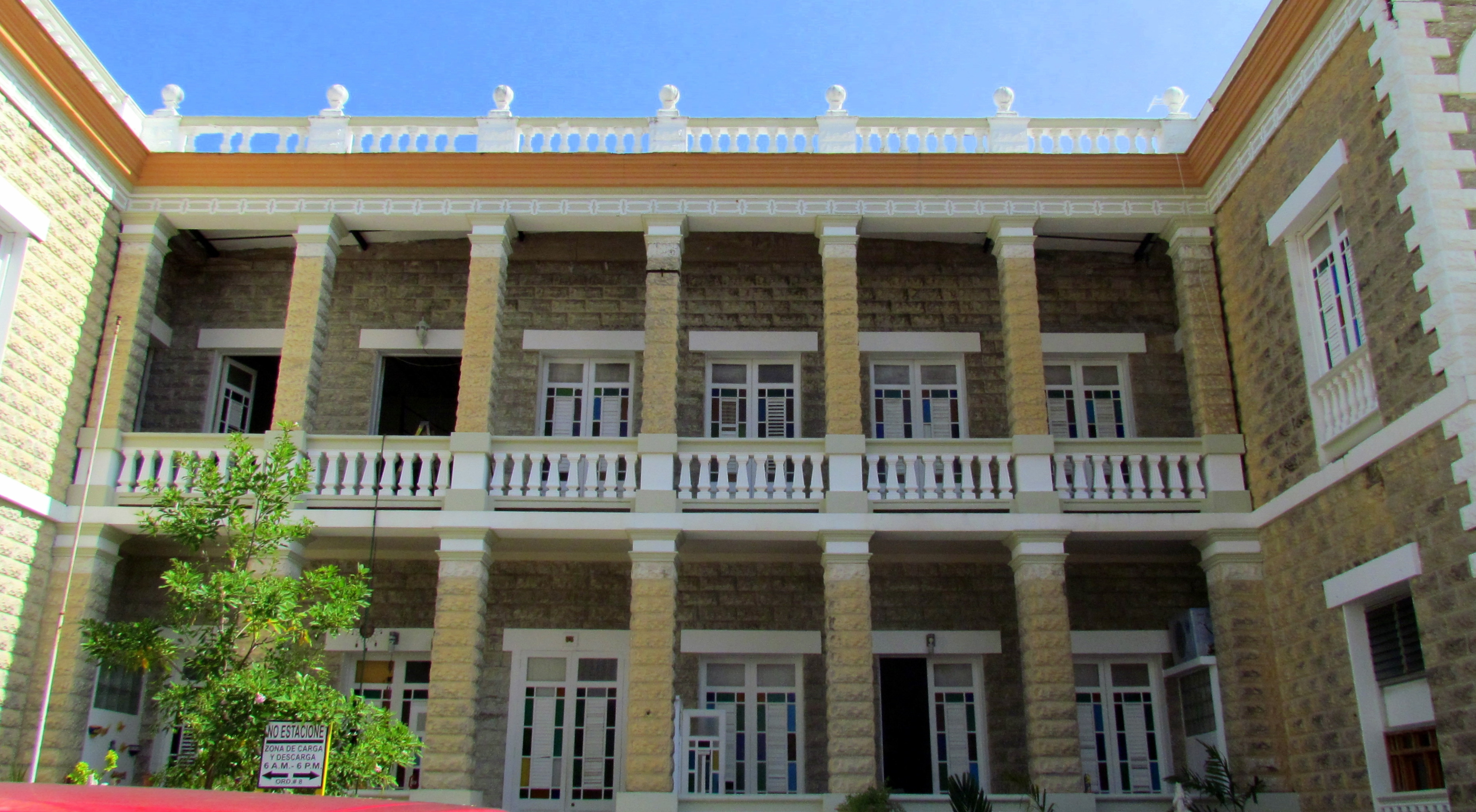
Antiguo Edificio Suliveres

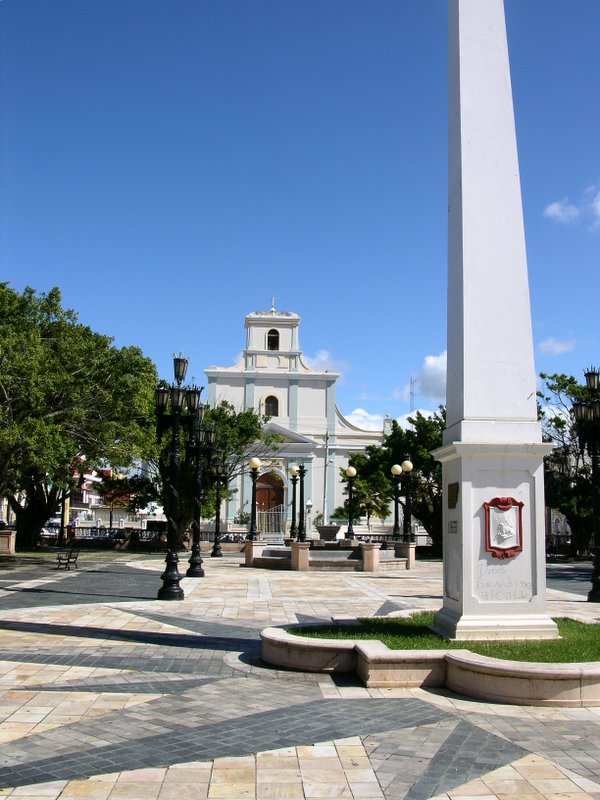
Plaza and Cathedral in Arecibo

== See also ==
- List of communities in Puerto Rico
- List of barrios and sectors of Arecibo, Puerto Rico
- National Register of Historic Places listings in northern Puerto Rico
