= Wanyonyi =

Wanyonyi is a surname of Kenyan origin. Notable people with the surname include:

- Emmanuel Wanyonyi (born 2004), Kenyan middle-distance runner
- Jehovah Wanyonyi (1924–2015), Kenyan self-proclaimed god
- Tim Wanyonyi (born 1963), Kenyan lawyer and politician
- Cimberly Wanyonyi (born 2005), Swedish singer
