= Casa de la Diosa Mita =

Historic building in Arecibo, Puerto Rico

- U.S. National Register of Historic Places
- Puerto Rico Historic Sites and Zones
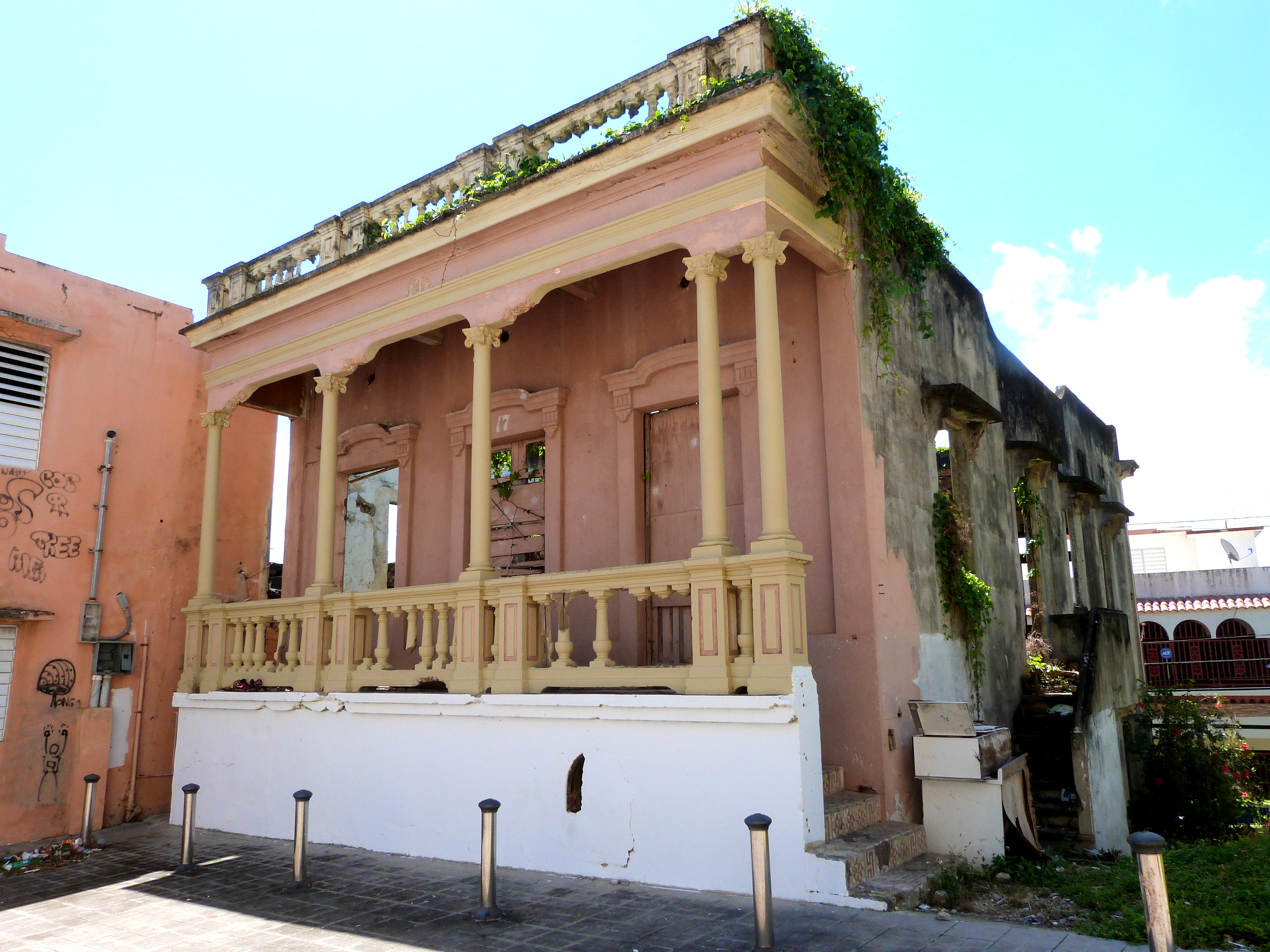
- Casa de la Diosa Mita in 2017

- Location within Puerto Rico
- Location: 251 Fernandez Juncos St., Arecibo, Puerto Rico
- Coordinates: 18.471503°N 66.719155°W
- Area: less than one acre
- Built: 1914
- Architectural style: Beaux Arts
- NRHP reference No.: 88000966
- RNSZH No.: 2000-(RN)-20-JP-SH

Significant dates
- Added to NRHP: September 9, 1988
- Designated RNSZH: December 21, 2000

The Casa de la Diosa Mita (in English, the House of the Goddess Mita) was a house located in Arecibo barrio-pueblo in Arecibo, Puerto Rico. The house itself is unique because of its Beaux-Arts architectural design and was listed on the National Register of Historic Places on September 9, 1988. It was listed on the Puerto Rico Register of Historic Sites and Zones in 2000.

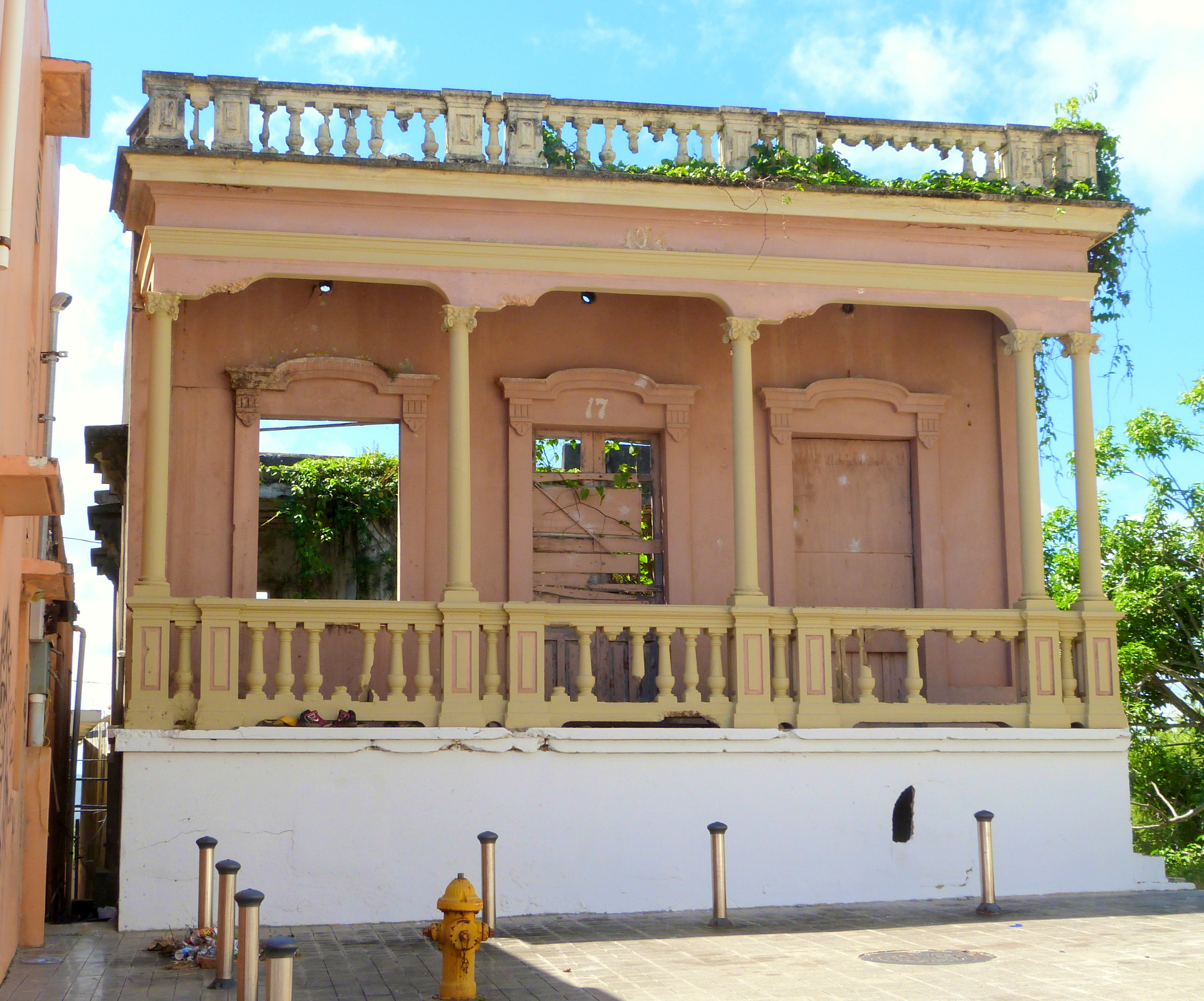
Remains of the house in 2017

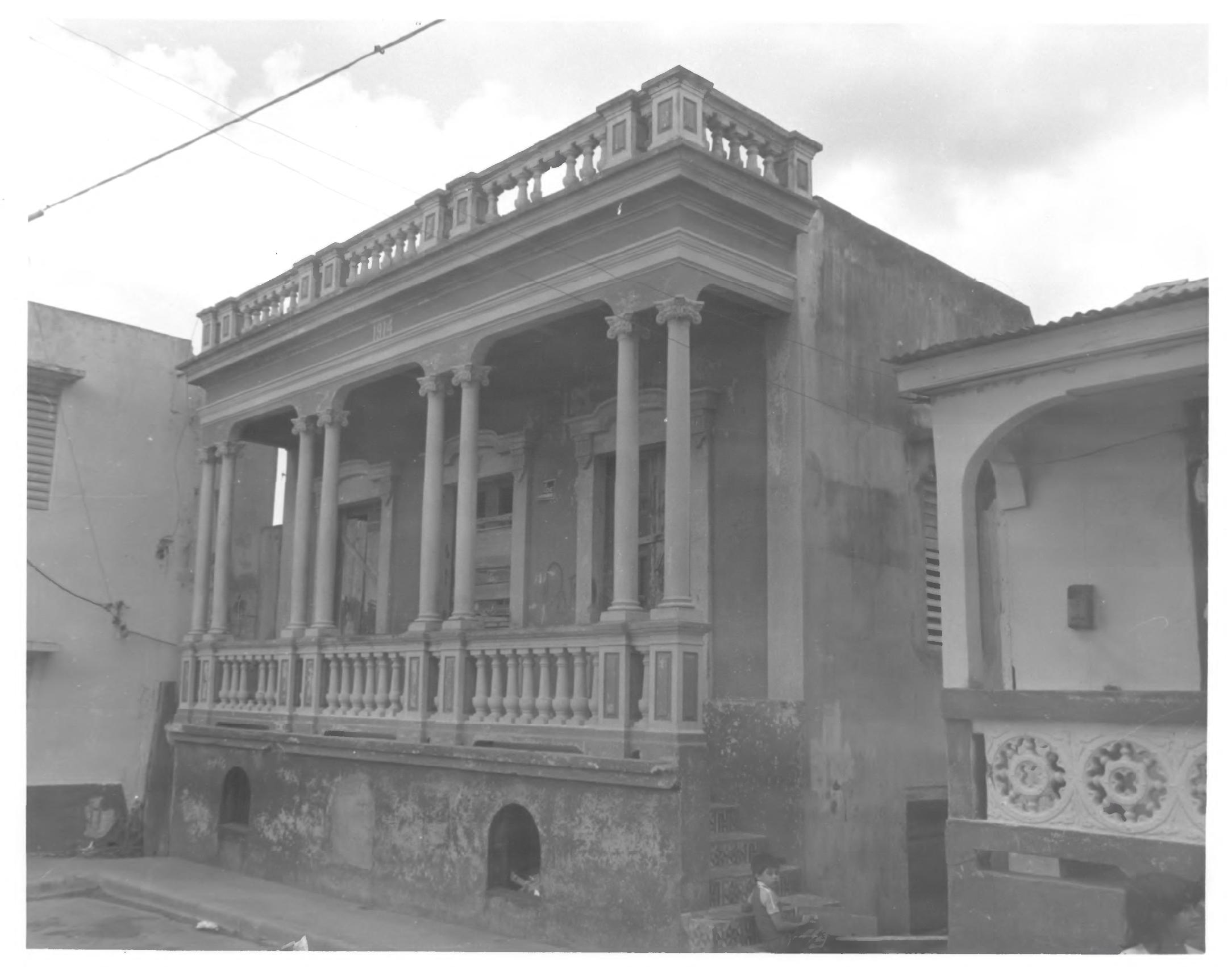
The intact house in 1987
