= Shinreikyo =

Japanese new religion founded in 1947

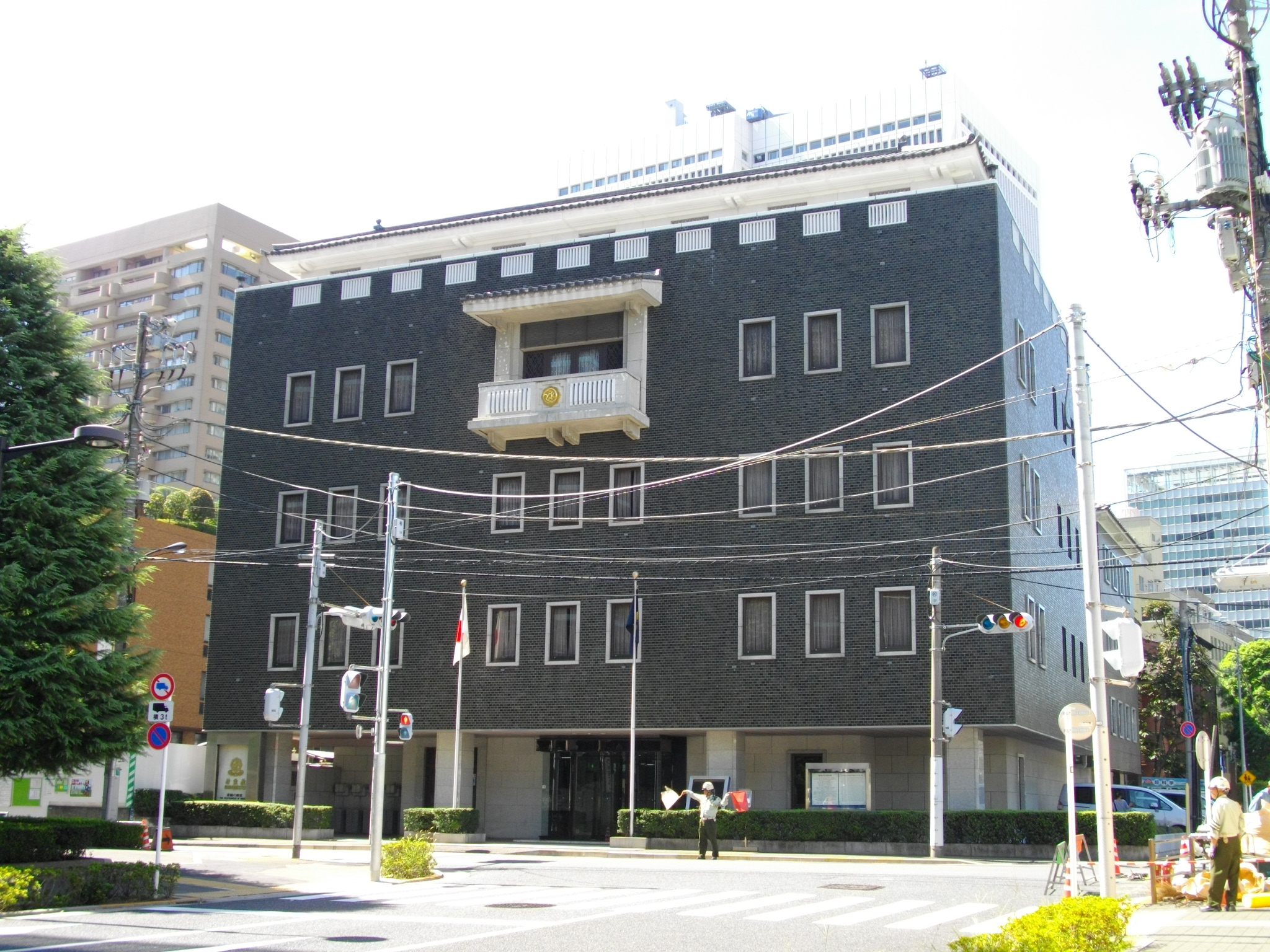
Shinreikyo Headquarters

Shinreikyo (神霊教 Shinreikyō) is a Japanese new religion founded in 1947. It claims to have 100,000 members.

== Foundation of the group ==
The group claims Kanichi Otsuka (大塚 寛一 Ōtsuka Kan'ichi) as its founder, but his wife Kunie Miyashitain also had a role in the development of the group. Kanichi Otsuka claimed to be a child prodigy and took the religious name "Kyososama" ("revered founder"). Shinreikyo believes "Kyososama is God made flesh." The group began in Nishinomiya, but by 1953 a site on a hill in the Akasaka district of Minato, Tokyo would become Shinreikyo headquarters.

Shinreikyo calls its literature "the Divine Teachings of Kyososama". It consists of a collection of the teachings of Otsuka.

Shrinreikyo is a Japanese religion, which was originally created in 1939 but was recognized only in June 1948 within the education system. The group is headquartered in Nishinomiya; however, the religious group has churches in Tokyo, Wakayama, Kyoto, Osaka, Kanazawa and in 1977 had a place in Honshu as well. The founder of the group is Master Kanichi Otsuka. Master Kanichi Otsuka is seen as a wise leader who is looked to when there is a loss of power regarding religious teachings. He was born on the island of Shikoku in 1885. It has been thought that his place of upbringing has made a significant impact on his religious teachings due to the purity of nature in his surroundings. The island on which Otsuka was brought up was always said to pertain to a "sacred atmosphere" as it is attributed to the birth of the Buddhist saint Kobo Daishi. It appeared as though Otsuka carried these divine spirits along with him as he traveled at the age of 16 to search for what he called the "hidden secrets of nature" and again went on a spiritual search at the age of 21 through Korea, China, and Mongolia. Also, not only did he begin his spiritual search at such an early age but at the age of 16, he was also said to have been able to predict the future of relatives and friends. According to his wife, Otsuka was believed to possess a special insight into the divine world of nature and in an interview regarding her husband she compared his insight to an electrical generator able to tap into energies and distribute it to people. Master Otsuka's goal was to unite this religion with Christian and Buddhist beliefs because Christ appeared in the West and Buddha appeared in the East, thus he sees Shinreikyo being the religion of the "center". This notion of "the center" has to do with the cosmic forces illustrated in the religion.

== Beliefs ==
Like many Japanese new religions the group is syncretistic. The primary connections are likely Buddhism and Taoism. The idea of "Kyososama" as God made flesh has precedents in various pagan religions, as well as later in Christianity. The sect is dualistic in that it believes in a material and spiritual division, but apparently it values both. The group strongly believes in miracles. They also believe the deceased faithful go to heaven through Sublime Transmigration, leaving bodies without rigor mortis or putrefaction. Also that miracles can occur to animals, plants, and even inanimate objects. That in fact the world is full of miracles.

Shinreikyo can be translated as "teachings of the spirit" and the symbol "shin" refers to either the heart of our "center". Therefore, this religious movement is a belief in the metaphysic. Shinreikyo follows the fundamental law of the universe, which is the existence of the truth and proof of this truth is illustrated through miracles. It is believed that the if one follows this law of the universe everything will go according to plan for one's health and happiness, however, if one goes against this law it will bring illness, misfortune, etc. Moreover, it is believed that master Otsuka of the Shinreikyo movement was able to heal individuals through his presence. He was able to heal people with diseases ranging from infantile paralysis, asthma, tuberculosis, and even cancer. In fact, a famous feature of Shinreikyo is that nearly all of those that follow the religion have experienced some sort of inexplicable miracle.

The four main categories include:

1. healing from serious ill-health
2. increased brain development and expansion of the skull
3. Transmigration after death
4. Miracles of natural birth

== Practices in Shinreikyo ==
Many practices take place within the Shinreikyo movement. A big practice done by Otsuka has to do with the spreading of “sacred salt” over ritual centers. The spreading of this salt is meant to heal sickness but also accelerate the growth of crops and effectively eliminate insects and pests from farming grounds. Another ritual done by Otsuka in the Shinreikyo movement includes cleansing oneself before prayer sessions or before entering a room. This is done by placing one’s hands together and starting from the top of your head moving them slowly down to the middle of your stomach while vibrating one’s hands and saying “BU-KAN-SEI-KI”. This phrase is a set of symbols that have no meaning but simply allow the individual to be present at the moment. This allows one to start from a blank slate and has been said to create changes in character over time.

== Nationalism ==
Shinreikyo has been described as nationalistic and has organized parades for national pride.

== See also ==
- List of people considered to be deities
- New religious movement

== Sources ==
- Koepping, Klaus-Peter (1977). "Ideologies and New Religious Movements: The case of Shinreikyo and its doctrines in comparative perspective". Japanese Journal of Religious Studies. 4/2 (3): 103–149.
- Laing, Christine (October 2006). "Shinreikyo: Miracles of Healing From Japan". acupuncturetoday.
- "An Overview of the Doctrine".
- Chryssides, George D. (2006). The A to Z of New Religious Movements. United States of America: The Scarecrow Press. p. 296. ISBN 9780810855885.
