= Egotheism =

Deification of the self

Egotheism, or autotheism (from Greek εαυτός, autos, 'self', and θεός, theos, 'god'), is the belief in the divinity of oneself or the potential for self-deification. This concept has appeared in various philosophical, religious, and cultural contexts throughout history, emphasizing the immanence of the divine or the individual's potential to achieve a godlike state. While critics often interpret autotheism as self-idolatry or hubris, proponents view it as a form of spiritual enlightenment or personal transcendence.

== History ==
=== Ancient religions ===
Autotheistic beliefs can be traced back to ancient civilizations, in which rulers and individuals were often deified. In ancient Egypt, pharaohs were declared gods during their reigns, merging their political and spiritual authority.

In Indian philosophy, identification of the self (atman) with the ultimate reality (Brahman), is expressed in the phrase aham brahmāsmi (lit. 'I am Brahman'). This reflects the idea that divinity resides inherently within the self and can be realized through spiritual awakening. Similarly, Jainism teaches that one who extinguishes all of their karma becomes a tirthankara with godlike knowledge and powers.

=== Middle Ages to the Enlightenment ===
In medieval Christianity, certain heterodox groups, such as the Adamites, believed in self-deification.

Early individuals who declared themselves to be gods include the English prophet John Robins and Danilo Filipov, who led a heterodox Quaker cult in Russia.

During the Protestant Reformation, Henry VIII was accused of autolatry for asserting his authority over the Church of England, effectively positioning himself as the supreme spiritual authority.

In the 18th century, Age of Enlightenment thinker Jean-Jacques Rousseau proposed a civil religion for French society, which critics accused of encouraging self-worship among citizens.

=== Post-Enlightenment thought ===
In the 19th century, Transcendentalist philosophies emerged, with Johann Gottlieb Fichte and Ralph Waldo Emerson emphasizing the divine potential of the individual. Critics labeled these ideas as "egotheism," accusing them of promoting excessive individualism.

In the 19th century, Max Stirner advocated for a form of autotheism through his philosophy of egoism. In his work The Ego and Its Own, Stirner argued that the individual is the ultimate authority and creator of meaning, rejecting external deities and societal constructs.

== Modern examples ==
=== Political and religious leaders ===
Founder of North Korea Kim Il-Sung instituted worship of himself amongst citizens; it is considered the only country to deify its ruler, with citizens bowing to his statues. After his death, he was declared "Eternal President" by the North Korean authorities.

Contemporary religious figures who have professed themselves to be deities include Father Divine and Jim Jones.

=== Mormonism ===
Mormon beliefs incorporate autotheistic elements through the doctrine of exaltation. This teaching holds that individuals can achieve godhood in the afterlife through faithfulness and spiritual progression, emphasizing the potential for divinity within each person.

=== Modern spirituality ===
Contemporary spiritual movements, such as those influenced by New Thought, often emphasize the divinity of the individual and the potential for self-realization. These movements focus on personal empowerment and the belief that individuals can achieve a godlike state through self-awareness and positive thinking.

== See also ==
- Apotheosis
- Church of Satan
- The Satanic Temple
- Divinization
- God complex
- Retrocausality
- Self religion
- The Essence of Christianity
- Theosis (Eastern Christian theology)
- List of pharaohs deified during lifetime
