= Jehovah Wanyonyi =

Kenyan self-proclaimed god

Michael Mwaboyi alias Jehovah Wanyonyi
- Born: 1924
- Died: 18 July 2015 (aged 90–91)
- Known for: Self-proclaimed god

Jehovah Wanyonyi (1924 – 18 July 2015) was a self-proclaimed god who lived in Chemororoch village in Uasin Gishu County, western Kenya. He claimed to be the Almighty God and deemed Jesus Christ to be his son. He considered Mount Elgon which is near his home to be Mount Zion. He died on July 18, 2015, at the age of 91.

He also claimed to be able to cure AIDS, and had stated that he would punish Kenya if the country did not give him 3 billion Kenyan shillings ($34.6 million). He referred to his ministry as the Lost Israelites of Kenya.

Wanyonyi had 70 wives and 95 children. He had several grandchildren. He refused to say if his children are also sons of God. Wanyonyi is said to have approximately 1,000 followers who consider him to be God.

== See also ==
- God complex
- Self-deification
