= Shaktyavesha avatara =

Power-embodied incarnation in Hinduism

A shaktyavesha avatara (Sanskrit: शक्त्यावेशावतार, romanized: Śaktyāveśāvatāra) is the power-embodied avatara (incarnation) of a deity in the Vaishnava tradition of Hinduism. The concept refers to living beings who are empowered by a deity towards the performance of certain acts or the achievement of a given mission. A portion of the potencies of a deity is believed to be present (āveśā) within a shaktyavesha avatara, invested with divine power. Vyasa, the Four Kumaras, Narada, Shesha, and Brahma are generally regarded to be the shaktyavesha avatars of Vishnu or Krishna in Vaishnavism.

== Literature ==
=== Garga Samhita ===
The Garga Samhita states that a shaktyavesha avatara is one of the six forms of incarnation of the deity Krishna, identified with Vishnu. The purpose of such an incarnation is regarded to be to enter a jiva (living being) in order to perform a given mission, after which the deity departs from this form.

=== Chaitanya Charitamrita ===
The Chaitanya Charitamrita offers six categories of the shaktyavesha avatars of Krishna and their purposes:

1. Shesha, empowered for the personal service of Vishnu (sva-sevana-śakti) and bearing all the planets within the universe (bhū-dhāraṇa-śakti)
2. Brahma, empowered for the creation of the cosmos (sṛṣṭi-śakti)
3. The Four Kumaras, empowered to distribute transcendental knowledge (jñāna-śakti)
4. Narada, empowered to distribute devotional service (bhakti-śakti)
5. Prithu, empowered to rule and maintain living entities (pālana-śakti)
6. Parashurama, empowered to cut down rogues and demons (duṣṭa-damana-śakti)

== See also ==
- Avatar
- Dashavatara
- Chaturvyuha
