= Xiongdi Gong =

Chinese protector deities of seafaring

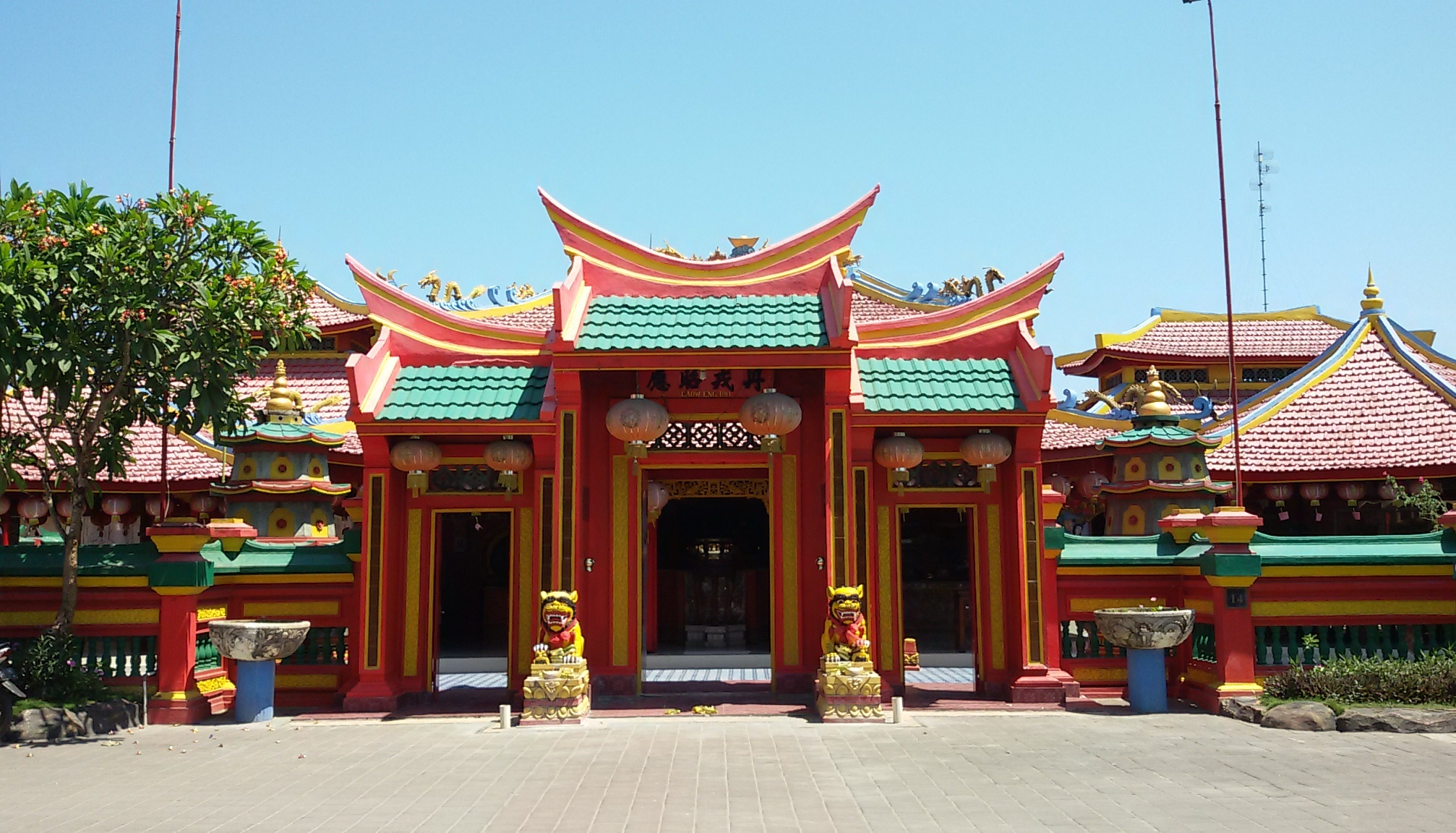
Caow Eng Bio Temple on Tanjung Benoa-Bali worships Xiongdi Gong

Xiongdi Gong (Hanzi=兄弟公; pinyin=xiōngdì gōng; Hokkien=Ya Ti Kong) or 108 Saints (Hainan 108 Brothers) are the protector deities of seafarers. They are usually worshiped along with Shui Wei Sheng Niang at Chinese temples near the sea by fishermen or seafarers. Their altar usually contains only one red faced scholar statue.

Xiongdi Gong greatly affected the spiritual life in Hainan. Their cult has spread around the world along with the immigrants from Hainan and has become a part of Hainan's identity.

== History ==
The People of China were suffering under the imperialism of the Qing dynasty which triggered the Chinese diaspora. In the time of Xianfeng Emperor (1831–1861), many people from Hainan went to Annam (now Vietnam) to earn money for their families. 109 men of Hainan planned to go home. Other Hainan peoples who were left in Annam entrusted their savings or valuables to those 109 men to take back to their families. On their way back across the sea, pirates captured their ships, took their belongings, and killed all but one man, the cook, who managed to survive by hiding under the deck.

After the incident, there was a storm along the coast of Vietnam and a flock of crows was observed crowding the king's palace. The king's seer said that those crows foretold a great crime which had gone unpunished. After a long search, the king heard a news about a pirate who had been captured at the market. One of Hainan people recognized the ring that the stranger had, the same ring that had been entrusted to the 109 Hainan for the wedding gift of his brother. After a fight, both of them were arrested and the stranger admitted his crime. The king ordered the capture of the rest of the pirates and confiscated their loot. After that, the king performed a ritual prayer to ask for peace for the souls of the 108 Hainan brothers. Then the flock of crows left his palace.

When the tragedy of the 108 Hainan brothers reached Hainan, the local people built a memorial temple for them. Annually, they commemorate the day of their death on the 27th day of the 5th lunar month. The Hainan people worship them as the protectors of seafarers. Seafarers who want to go abroad usually pray to Xiongdi Gong and bring a cook as their witness.

== See also ==
- Chinese folk religion
