= Worship of the living =

Worshipping living people in East Asian culture

Worship of the living (Chinese: 生祠; pinyin: shēngsì; Japanese: 生祀; rōmaji: seishi) is the worship of living people practiced in the East Asian cultural sphere. In China, it is practiced at sheng shrines (Chinese: 生祠; pinyin: shēng cí). There are two types of enshrinement: the enshrinement of the spirit of a living person who has made a significant contribution, and the enshrinement of one's own spirit.

Owing to its usage by Wei Zhongxian, the practice became seen as a sign of corruption and declined in China. In Japan, the practice was most prominent with the worship of the emperor during the period of the imperial State Shinto from the late 19th century until 1945.

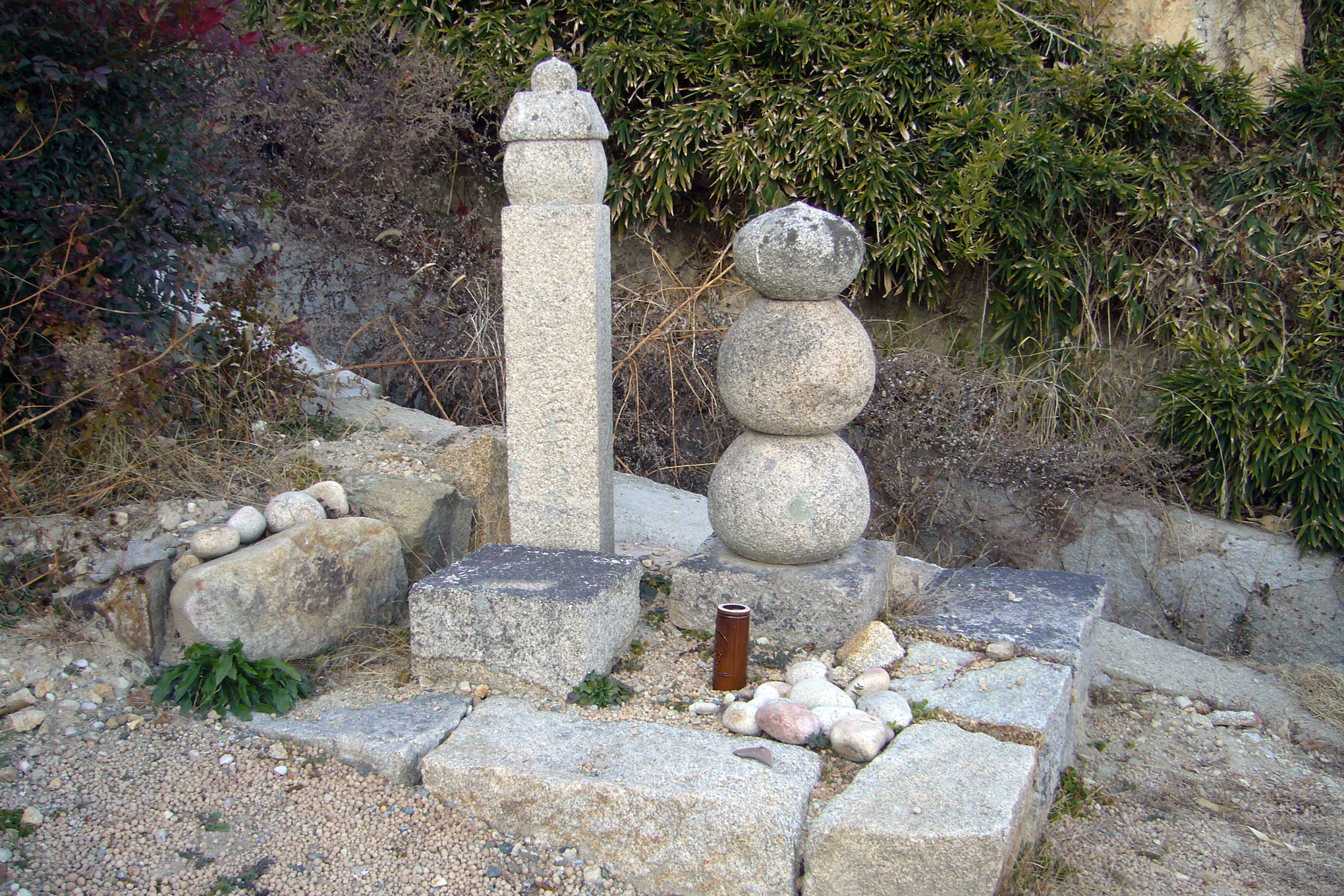
Hiraga Gennai's sheng shrine in Hiroshima Prefecture, Fukuyama City, Tomomachi

== In China ==
When Former Han's Reunobu was the prime minister of Yan, he built his shrine between Yan and Qi and called it the "Reun Gong Shrine". Also, when Shiqing was the prime minister of Qi, the Qi people built the "Shiqing Shrine". This is the beginning of the birth shrine.

In the Tang dynasty, there were certain restrictions on the construction of monuments and shrines by officials in office. According to the Tang Rulings and Ordinances, those who erected shrines or monuments without permission were subject to a penalty of one year of imprisonment. The Tang dynasty called it "the difficulty of building monuments and shrines on the first day.

In the Ming, peasants in Tengzhou built a shrine to commemorate Zhao Bangqing, who was appointed to Yanjing for his clean politics. The shrine was built to commemorate him.

During the reign of the Tianqi Emperor of the Ming dynasty, the eunuch Wei Zhongxian, ruled the world by conducting his own politics, and those who flattered him or feared his authority were given a sheng shrine from him. In May of the seventh year of the reign of Emperor Tianjing (1627), Lu Wanling, the prefect of the State Council, wrote: "Confucius wrote the Spring and Autumn, and Chung-Hsien wrote the Essentials. In May of the seventh year of the reign of Emperor Tianjing, Lu Wanling, the prefect of the State Council, wrote that Confucius had written the "Spring and Autumn" and Chung-Hsien had written the "Essentials. In April of the 7th year of the reign of Emperor Tianjing, Yuan Chonghuan and Yan Mingtai of the Ministry of War made an appeal to the government to praise the merits and demerits of Wei Zhongxian and to establish a sheng shrine for him in both Qiantu. After that, Wei Zhongxian's raw shrine was "all over the world", "the cost of each shrine was at most hundreds of thousands, at least tens of thousands", "stolen the people's fortune, invaded the public safe, and was cut down. There are countless trees. " When Huang Yun Yasushi made a statue and greeted the statue, he said, "Goto Sansho," and "led the general of Bunbu, lined up under the stairs, and worshipped as the beginning."

Wei Zhongxian has been strongly condemned in modern times for his behavior.

Gu Yanwu lamented, "In this generation, there is no official who does not build a sheng shrine. And within a few years of leaving office, he would destroy the statues and change their masters.

Recently a person in China created their own Sheng shrine and stirred online controversy.

== In Japan ==
The Edo period (1603-1868) saw a rise in the practice of seishi, or the establishment of one's own spiritual memorial site, where one's soul would be enshrined and worshipped after death. One notable example of this practice is that of Matsudaira Sadanobu, who established his own seishi at Okuzawa Hachiman-gu in 1797.

The rise in seishi is thought to have been influenced by Chinese philosophy, specifically Edo neo-Confucianism, which was introduced to Japan during the Edo period. One notable figure of this period, Yamazaki Ansai, is said to have devised rituals for seishi based on Confucian ceremonies, and established his own seishi in 1671 at his residence in Kyoto.

After this, many scholars and practitioners of Shinto and the Hirata school of kokugaku ("national study") also established their own seishi, each with their own unique rituals. These seishi were believed to be a means of obtaining longevity in life or becoming a god after death. The practice is said to have originated from the mythological story of the sun goddess Amaterasu, who enshrined her own divine spirit at Mount Miwa.

The study of seishi is particularly associated with Genchi Kato, who has identified 670 known seishi, with the most recent being established in 1931 at the Nishi-Chogo Shrine in Higashikokura, Hokkaido. The seishi of Emperor Meiji was established in 1876 in Ishinomaki, Miyagi Prefecture, and again in 1893 at the Yahiko Shrine in Tatsuno, Nagano Prefecture. The seishi of Emperor Meiji, Empress Shōken, Emperor Taisho, and Empress Teimei were also established in various locations, including Hokkaido, Hiroshima, and Himeji.

== See also ==
- Tamaya
- Okutsuki
- Hitogami
- List of people who have been considered deities
