= Clergy of ancient Egypt =

typical depiction of an ancient Egyptian priest with a Leopard skin

R8 U36
Priest
in hieroglyphs

Gardiner: ḥm-nṯr

The clergy of ancient Egypt was made up of a multitude of priests (Note: Although the word priest is commonly used to designate the ancient Egyptians who worked in the service of the gods, it can be misleading, as their function was so far from that of Catholic priests in Western culture.) (Note: ḥm-nṯr literally person of the god, an expression translated by the Greeks as "prophet".) who worshipped the many gods of the Egyptian religion.

== Function ==
In Egyptian thought, the gods shaped the Earth and established a divine cosmic harmony (Maat) that allowed the miracle of life to unfold day after day. It was the responsibility of the pharaoh, believed to be a descendant of the gods, to maintain continuity of this harmony and to combat the forces of chaos (Isfet) that continually strove to break it. The pharaoh is the only intermediary between the divinities and mortals. The maintenance of divine harmony required numerous daily services throughout the land of Egypt. Thus the fundamental role of the priest was to replace the pharaoh in the material execution of daily rites.

== Hierarchy ==
Pharaoh is the first of the holy. He appoints the leaders of the great sanctuaries, for he needs to control this powerful clergy. Below them are the priests, which in veritable dynasties inherit the office from father to son. This class is highly hierarchical; priests are appointed by their peers and senior officials. Newly invested priests were required to demonstrate a sound knowledge of theology, medicine, astronomy, and any other subject relating to the god they intend to be a priest for. For example, the priests of Ra were reputed to have been particularly well-versed in the knowledge of the heavens. The temples of the gods were also places of knowledge, thanks to their libraries.

R8 U36 T8 N35 M17 Y5 N35
The first prophet of Amon (Note: Title of high priest of Amon at Karnak)
in hieroglyphs
Era: New Kingdom
(1550–1069 BC)
Gardiner: ḥm-nṯr tp(y) Jmn

Presiding over the temple's destiny, overseeing the daily ritual and administering the god's lands, the priests formed a privileged, careful hierarchy. (Note: According to Serge Sauneron, there are more than one hundred and twenty-five different functions, from the lower to the upper clergy.)

The colleges were placed under the authority of a high priest who bore, rather than a title, a specific epithet:

- the pontiff of Heliopolis is described as the "Greatest of the Seers of Ra",
- that of Memphis as "Chief of the Artisans",
- that of Hermopolis Parva as "Greatest of the Five of the House of Thoth",
- and in Karnak, "The one who opens the Two Gates of Heaven".

The high priest of Ptah in Memphis is priest-sem. (Note: I'm a sem priest with clean fingers)

The priests of the high clergy attached to a temple are organized into four colleges who take turns each month in the service of the god.

Most of these priests held hereditary positions. Most of this vocabulary is of Greek origin, thanks to Ptolemaic texts. Among them are the following specialists:

U36 D28 A1
Funeral priest (Note: Literally servant of ka)
in hieroglyphs

Gardiner: ḥm-kȝ

- the priest-choachyte, in charge of the funerary cult;
- the priests of Ka, in charge of daily worship, known as the "Servants of Ka";
- The priests-hery-heb, "those who carry the feast", whose role is to read the funeral liturgy;
- the ritual priests (ḫr(y).w-ḥb.t), literally those under the ritual, responsible for reading the glorifications during funeral ceremonies;
- thekhereb-priests, who read incantatory formulas from the Book of the Dead;
- The priests-paraschists, or incisors, who remove the viscera during mummification;
- priests-taricheutes, who are the real embalmers;
- priest-colchytes, who help with all embalming operations;
- The astronomer-priest, who determines the right moment to launch the ceremonies;
- the hemerologist priest, is able to distinguish between the good and bad days of the year.

Some, reputedly gifted with supernatural talents, act as exorcists and magicians, and even as doctors in towns and villages.

D60 N35A A1
Priest-ouâb
in hieroglyphs

Gardiner: wˁb

At the bottom of the hierarchy are the priests-ouâb (wˁb), literally pure priests, as bodily cleanliness was a duty of their office. Thus, shaving one's hair was a distinguishing mark for priests, underlining their quest for purity, as was daily depilation.

The priests were assisted by clerics, the purifiers, in charge of preparing the food offered to the god, as well as by musicians and singers dedicated to his entertainment.

When not on duty, the priests looked after the estates entrusted to them by the Pharaoh.

== Ritual ==
The priests begin their day of worship with a purifying morning bath. They then proceed in procession to the heart of the temple to awaken the god who slumbers in the darkness of the sanctuary.

Led by the high priest, the ritual begins just as the sun appears over the horizon. The clay seal that seals the door every evening must first be broken before the door leaves are opened. The high priest raises his hands towards the statue to "give back his soul" to the god, and pronounces a consecrated formula: "Awaken, great god, awaken in peace!" The food offerings prepared for the god are then placed before him: bread, onions, salads, beef, beer, and wine. When the god has consumed the invisible matter of the food, it is distributed among the other gods in the temple and then eaten by the priests.

When the priest performs these gestures, it is Pharaoh, and all Egypt below him, who becomes the god's entire servant. Whether priest or Pharaoh himself, the officiant stands before the altar, barefoot so as not to defile the place with his soles. He holds the kherep scepter of consecration, the hedj club, traditional in this kind of ceremony, and extends his hand over the offerings. Breakfast is followed by dressing and anointing.

On leaving, footprints are swept from the floor.

In addition to this daily ceremony, there are two other rendezvous with the god, at midday and in the evening. But these are limited to ritual gestures, sprinkling water, and smoking incense outside the sanctuary: the god must be honored, but not disturbed in his meditation.

== Priestesses ==
Although Herodotus asserted that "No woman exercises the priesthood of a god or goddess...", it is known that women in ancient Egypt participated, in various capacities, in the service of divinities.

In the Fifth Dynasty, Hetpet was a priestess of Hathor. However, there is no way of determining her exact role or position in the clerical hierarchy.

In the New Kingdom, priestesses who were the king's daughters or wives were referred to as Divine Worshippers of Amun; but from the beginning of the New Kingdom, the Theban cult of Amun used Divine Worshippers of Amun of non-royal blood as female auxiliaries, the "singers of the interior of Amun" (hezyt net khenou in Imen):

- shemdyt singers, who appeared as early as the Eighteenth Dynasty;
- hezyt singer-musicians;
- sistrum players sekhemyt and ihyt, the latter from the Libyan to the Late Period.

== See also ==
- Ancient Egypt
- Women in ancient Egypt
- Divine Adoratrice of Amun
- High Priest of Amun
- List of pharaohs deified during lifetime

== Bibliography ==
- Sauneron, Serge (1998). Les prêtres de l'ancienne Égypte. ISBN 978-2020347792.
- Yoyotte, Jean (1961). "Les vierges consacrées d'Amon thébain". Comptes rendus des séances de l'Académie des inscriptions et belles-lettres.
- Grandet, Pierre; Mathieu, Bernard. Cours d'égyptien hiéroglyphique. pp. 62, 150, 235, 448.
