= Juanita García Peraza =

Founder of the "Mita congregation"

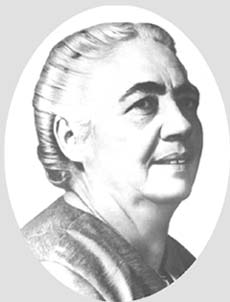
- Peraza was the founder of the only non-Catholic denomination religion of Puerto Rican origin.
- Born: June 24, 1897; Hatillo, Puerto Rico
- Died: February 21, 1970 (aged 72); San Juan, Puerto Rico
- Occupation: religious leader

Notes
- Peraza was known as "Mita", the name by which the congregation and their religion are known by.

Juanita García Peraza also known as "Mita" (June 24, 1897 – February 21, 1970) was the founder of the Mita Congregation, a Christian denomination with Puerto Rican origins which is described in Melton's Encyclopedia of Protestantism. When Peraza died, the Senate of Puerto Rico closed their offices for three days in her honor.

== Early years ==
García Peraza was born in Hatillo, Puerto Rico, and raised by her parents, both belonging to wealthy Catholic families that had immigrated to Puerto Rico from the Canary Islands in the 1830s. Her father had previously married one of his cousins, of the prominent García family of the Arecibo, Puerto Rico, region; well-known Puerto Rican writer René Marqués García is one of her nephews. After divorcing his cousin, her father married García Peraza's mother, from another Canarian family. When her family moved to their townhouse in Arecibo, García Peraza became extremely ill. She made a promise to Mita God that if she was cured, she would always serve him.

García Peraza considered it a miracle that she was cured of her illness and she decided to keep her promise. She was one of the first Puerto Rican women to preach religion in Puerto Rico. Soon, she claimed to have the gift of prophecy and said that she received a new revelation from God that the new name of the Holy Spirit was "Mita". The church leaders did not accept such a prophecy and she was asked to leave. She and 11 members left and formed the congregation we see today.

== "Mita" ==
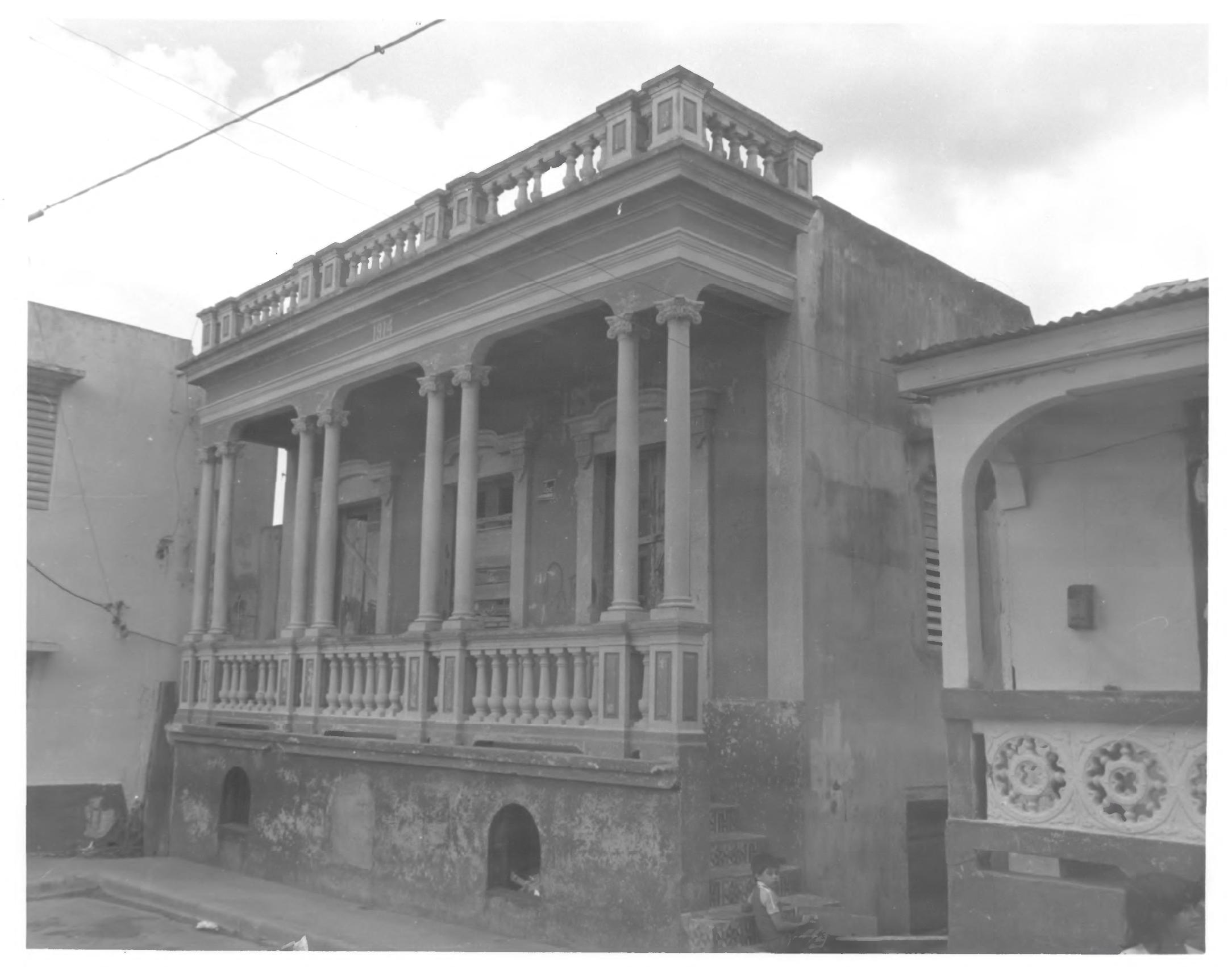
Peraza's house in Arecibo

García Peraza left the Roman Catholicism and converted to the Protestant Iglesia de Dios Pentecostal M.I., and then left the church with 11 other members who followed her to start their own religion. In 1940, she and her followers founded their own church in Arecibo, and in 1947 she relocated to the current location of Hato Rey, a suburb of San Juan. They call themselves "Mitas" and their church "the Mita congregation". According to the Mita congregation, Mita is the name of the Holy Ghost on earth.

Under García Peraza's leadership, the church founded many small businesses which provided work, orientation, and help for its members. The first branch of the church outside of Puerto Rico was established in New York City. The church has expanded to Mexico, Colombia, Venezuela, Dominican Republic, Costa Rica, Panama, El Salvador, Canada, Ecuador, Spain and other countries.

== Legacy ==
Juanita "Mita" García Peraza died on February 21, 1970, in San Juan, Puerto Rico. Teófilo Vargas Sein ("Aarón"), was appointed Leader of the church. Puerto Rico honored Juanita García Peraza's memory by naming an elementary school after her in San Juan.

== See also ==
- List of Puerto Ricans
- History of women in Puerto Rico
