= Mita Congregation =

Christian denomination with headquarters in Puerto Rico

The Mita Congregation (Spanish: Congregación Mita) is a Christianity-based new religious movement with headquarters in Puerto Rico. They differ from mainstream Christianity in some worship practices and in their belief that Juanita García Peraza, who they call "Mita", was anointed by God. The congregation has chapters in the United States, Canada, Venezuela, Colombia, Ecuador, Chile, Panama, Costa Rica, Mexico, El Salvador, Italy and the Dominican Republic.

They have an estimated 100,000 members worldwide.

== History ==
The Mita Congregation was founded in Arecibo in 1940, when Mita said that God had chosen her to found a church. In 1947, the church was relocated to Hato Rey.

Mitas, as her followers are called, believe that Juanita García Peraza was chosen by God and that she became the prophet of the Holy Spirit in its third manifestation. First, as the omnipotent Father in Jehovah; then in his beloved son Jesus; and in its third manifestation, with a new name revealed, Mita, the name of the Holy Spirit of God.

According to their beliefs, the Holy Spirit once acted through Juanita García Peraza and anointed Teófilo Vargas Seín (October 23, 1921 – January 18, 2021) as the first anointed of God in what they call the new manifestation of God, the third manifestation, the Holy Trinity, the father, son, and the Holy Spirit. According to the church, Vargas was renamed Aarón, and before Peraza died in 1970, she called Aarón and told him to take care of his church. He was the spiritual leader of the Mita Congregation until his death due to cardiovascular conditions, dying on January 18, 2021, in San Juan, Puerto Rico.

Aarón was known in the church and in the communities as a very enthusiastic and people-oriented leader, spending hours of his day helping those in need, visiting hospitals, and visiting the poorest communities. He also brought about significant growth in the number of church members, taking it to many countries across the Americas and Europe through vast preaching campaigns, during which he would perform up to 5 church services in a single day in different communities.

The Congregation is now led by Rosinin Rodriguez, whom Aarón named in 2012 as his successor and the Spiritual Mother of the church.

== Doctrine ==
The doctrine of the church is based on the original Reina-Valera Spanish translation of the Bible. They describe themselves as trinitarian, though they affirm an unorthodox belief in Jehovah, Jesus Christ and the Holy Spirit (Mita), who they believe "is on earth, that His new name is Mita and that, through Aarón, He guides His Church and guides it through truth and justice towards salvation". Aarón is considered God's prophet for today, and through him God's message of cleansing, freedom from sin, and unity is brought to the world. "Mita en Aarón" (Mita in Aaron) is a slogan of the Mita Congregation.

Mita members always clarify that when they talk about Mita in their hymns or preachings they are not referring to Juanita Garcia Peraza, but referring to the new name of the Holy Spirit who, at some point in the late 40s, called Juanita by His own name.
