= Arahitogami =

Type of divine being in Shinto

Arahitogami (現人神) is a Japanese word, meaning a kami (or deity) who is a human being. It first appeared in the Nihon Shoki (c. 720) as the words of Yamato Takeru saying: "I am the son of an arahitogami."

In 1946, at the request of the GHQ, the Shōwa Emperor (Hirohito) proclaimed in the Humanity Declaration that he had never been an akitsumikami (現御神), divinity in human form, and claimed his relation to the people did not rely on such a mythological idea but on a historically developed family-like reliance. However, the declaration excluded the word arahitogami.

In Shinto it is somewhat common for a person to be revered as a god, especially after they have died. Examples include Sugawara no Michizane and Tokugawa Ieyasu.

It is also linked to the Chinese concept of worship of the living.

== Difference between akitsumikami and arahitogami ==
Akitsumikami is often translated as "divine" or "divinity", but some Western scholars (including John W. Dower and Herbert P. Bix) explained that its real meaning is "manifest kami" (or, more generally, "incarnation of a god"), and that therefore the emperor would still be, according to the declaration, an arahitogami ("living god"), although not an akitsumikami ("manifest kami"). Jean Herbert explains that, according to the Japanese tradition, the figure of the emperor would be "the extension in time" of the goddess Amaterasu and the previous emperors, representing a naka ima (中今?). Consequently, it would be inadmissible to deny its divine origin.

== See also ==
- Avatar
- Divine right of kings
- Mandate of Heaven
- Imperial cult
- Incarnation
- Worship of the living
