= God complex =

Inflated feelings of personal ability, privilege, or infallibility

A god complex is an unshakable belief characterized by consistently inflated feelings of personal ability, privilege, or infallibility. The person is also highly dogmatic in their views, meaning the person speaks of their personal opinions as though they were unquestionably correct. Someone with a god complex may exhibit no regard for the conventions and demands of society, and may request special consideration or privileges.

God complex is not a clinical term nor diagnosable disorder and does not appear in the Diagnostic and Statistical Manual of Mental Disorders (DSM). The recognized diagnostic name for the behaviors associated with a god complex is narcissistic personality disorder (NPD). A god complex may also be associated with mania or a superiority complex.

The first person to use the term "god complex" was Ernest Jones (1879–1958). His description, at least in the contents page of Essays in Applied Psycho-Analysis, describes the god complex as belief that one is a god.

== Jehovah complex ==
Jehovah complex is a related term used in Jungian analysis to describe a neurosis of egotistical self-inflation. Use included in psychoanalytic contributions to psychohistory and biography, with, for example, Fritz Wittels using the term about Sigmund Freud in his 1924 biography and H. E. Barnes using the term about George Washington and Andrew Jackson.

== See also ==
- Abnormal psychology
- Cult of personality
- Egotheism
- Fanaticism
- Grandiose delusions
- Hubris
- Mental health of Jesus
- Messiah complex
- Narcissism
- Omnipotence
- Personal fable
- Playing God (ethics)
- Narcissistic Personality Disorder
- Shirk (Islam)
- Homelander
