= Deaths in February 1985 =

The following is a list of notable deaths in February 1985.

Entries for each day are listed alphabetically by surname. A typical entry lists information in the following sequence:

- Name, age, country of citizenship at birth, subsequent country of citizenship (if applicable), reason for notability, cause of death (if known), and reference.

== February 1985 ==
=== 1 ===
- Henry B. Bogue, 92, American football and basketball coach.
- Robert Chartham, 73, English writer.
- Daniel González, 30, Uruguayan footballer, traffic collision.
- Roosie Hudson, 69, American basketball player.
- Harry Hynd, 84, British politician and trade unionist, MP (1945–1966).
- Ipolite Khvichia, 74, Soviet Georgian actor.
- Anton Kutter, 81, German filmmaker.
- Yuri Rumer, 83, Soviet theoretical physicist.
- Joseph Stéphan, 56, French Olympic sprinter (1948).
- Baba Yabo, 59, Beninese actor and comedian.
- Yōko Yaguchi, 63, Japanese actress.

=== 2 ===
- Márton Bukovi, 81, Hungarian football player and manager.
- Bianca Doria, 69, Italian actress.
- Velen Fanderlik, 77, Czechoslovak scouting educator.
- Washington Guzmán, 66, Chilean Olympic swimmer (1936).
- Joseph Meyerhoff, 85, Russian-born American businessman and philanthropist.
- Hermann Priess, 83, German general and convicted war criminal.
- Micheline Coulombe Saint-Marcoux, 46, Canadian composer and music educator, brain cancer.
- Shyam Sundar Shyam, 61, Indian politician.
- Francis G. Slack, 87, American physicist, heart attack.

=== 3 ===
- Renato Angiolini, 61, Italian songwriter and pianist.
- George Bihlman, 89, American Olympic track and field athlete (1920).
- John Dellert, 100, American Olympic gymnast (1904).
- Johnnie Bob Dixon, 85, American baseball player.
- Wallace House, 55-56, Canadian politician.
- Santiago Lazcano, 37, Spanish racing cyclist, traffic collision.
- Sumter de Leon Lowry Jr., 91, American general, politician, and insurance executive.
- Frank Oppenheimer, 72, American physicist and science educator, lung cancer.
- Hank A. Smith, 91, American football player.

=== 4 ===
- Norman Beeston, 84, Australian cricketer.
- William Lee Bergstrom, 33, American gambler, suicide by drug overdose.
- Betsy Blackwell, 79, American magazine editor, emphysema.
- Thomas E. Delahanty, 70, American judge.
- Jesse Hibbs, 79, American film and television director and football player.
- Nicolas Hoydonckx, 84, Belgian footballer.
- Ramón Llorens, 78, Spanish football player and coach.
- John Wexley, 77, American writer and playwright (The Last Mile), heart attack.
- Bobby Young, 60, American baseball player, heart attack.

=== 5 ===
- Kaarlo af Heurlin, 69, Finnish politician, MP (1966–1970).
- Les Berry, 78, English cricketer.
- Reber Simpkins Cann, 82, American educator and community activist.
- Sydney Cozens, 76, British racing cyclist and Olympic sprinter (1928).
- Hans Croon, 48, Dutch football manager, injuries sustained in a traffic collision.
- Harry Dale, 85, English footballer.
- Harry Lancaster, 73, American baseball and basketball coach, liver cancer.
- Georges-Émile Lapalme, 78, Canadian politician.
- Lawrie Lindsay, 63, Scottish footballer.
- Neil McCarthy, 52, English actor, amyotrophic lateral sclerosis.
- Richard Nutt, 73, Australian cricketer.
- Yitzhak Seiger, 48, Israeli politician, MP (since 1981).
- Erich Stoschek, 81, German Olympic javelin thrower (1928).

=== 6 ===
- Alberto Inocente Álvarez, 78, Cuban politician and diplomat.
- Dadash Babazhanov, 62, Soviet Kazakh soldier.
- James Hadley Chase, 78, English novelist (No Orchids for Miss Blandish).
- Lou Cusanovich, 72, American politician, member of the California State Assembly (1957–1967) and California State Senate (1967–1980).
- Joseph Stephen Crane, 68, American actor and restaurateur.
- Muriel Gardiner, 83, American psychoanalyst and humanitarian, cancer.
- Shelomo Dov Goitein, 84, German-American historian, heart attack.
- Inger Hagerup, 79, Norwegian poet and author.
- Harald Johan Løbak, 80, Norwegian politician, MP (1945–1973).
- Lloyd Emerson Roulet, 93, American politician.
- Shirley Russell, 98, American artist.
- Eduard Wahl, 81, German politician.
- Natalia Zabila, 81, Soviet Ukrainian novelist, poet and playwright.

=== 7 ===
- Francis Affleck, 34, Canadian racing driver, racing crash.
- Robert Day, 84, American cartoonist.
- George W. Headley, 77, American jewelry designer.
- Matt Monro, 54, English singer, liver cancer.
- Vera D. Rubin, 73, American anthropologist and gerontologist.

=== 8 ===
- Norah Baring, 79, English actress, pneumonia.
- Ernst Brüche, 84, German physicist.
- Sir Charles Burns, 86, New Zealand doctor and medical administrator.
- Bradford G. Chynoweth, 94, American general.
- Ursula Edgcumbe, 84-85, British artist.
- Paul Erdal, 82, Norwegian Olympic boxer (1920).
- Tom Greenway, 75, American actor, heart attack.
- François Leduc, 89, Canadian politician.
- Sir William Lyons, 83, English automobile engineer and designer (Jaguar Cars).
- Marvin Miller, 71, American actor (Forbidden Planet, The Millionaire), heart attack.
- Orsola Nemi, 81, Italian writer.
- Harold Ockenga, 79, American evangelist, cancer.
- Sir Guy Salisbury-Jones, 88, British general.
- Alfred Stanford, 84, American naval officer.
- Charles Watts, 79, English cricketer.

=== 9 ===
- Kiki Camarena, 37, Mexican-American drug enforcement officer, blunt force trauma.
- Ingemar Franzén, 57, Swedish Olympic weightlifter (1956).
- Edward K. Gill, 67, American politician, member of the New Jersey General Assembly (since 1982), heart disease.
- Eugeniusz Kwiatkowski, 52, Polish Olympic shot putter (1960).
- Harry Perry, 96, American cinematographer (Hell's Angels, Wings).
- Garland Roark, 80, American novelist.
- Humphrey Trevelyan, Baron Trevelyan, 79, British diplomat.

=== 10 ===
- M. S. Arnoni, 63, Polish-American journalist.
- Nicolás Castellanos, 73, Cuban politician.
- Reynaldo Dante, 72, Filipino actor.
- Henri Fleisch, 81, French archaeologist.
- Werner Hinz, 82, German actor.
- Franciszek Kawa, 83, Polish Olympic skier (1928).
- Johnny Mokan, 89, American baseball player.
- Charles Montaland, 74, French organist.
- George Mooney, 88, American football player.
- John M. Nickolaus Jr., 71, American cinematographer, cancer.
- Werner Schröer, 66, German flying ace.
- Wanda Tuchock, 86, American screenwriter.

=== 11 ===
- Ben Abruzzo, 54, American balloonist, plane crash.
- Nat Caldwell, 72, American journalist, traffic collision.
- Conrad Detrez, 47, Belgian journalist and diplomat, AIDS.
- Henry Hathaway, 86, American filmmaker (The Lives of a Bengal Lancer), complications from a heart attack.
- Thomas Taro Higa, 68, American soldier and inventor.
- Frank Arthur Hooper, 89, American judge.
- George James Hopkins, 88, American playwright and set designer.
- Monique Leroux, 46, French Olympic fencer (1960).
- Rudy Lyle, 54, American banjoist.
- José Maldonado González, 84, Spanish politician, exile president (1970–1977), respiratory disease.
- Talgat Nigmatulin, 35, Soviet actor, murdered.
- Heinz Roemheld, 83, American composer, pneumonia.
- Víctor Palomo, 36, Spanish racing cyclist, heart and liver failure.
- Joseph Maria Pernicone, 81, Italian-born American Roman Catholic prelate, stroke.
- C. Suntharalingam, 89, Sri Lankan politician, MP (1947–1960).
- Pieter van Dam, 80, Dutch Olympic gymnast (1928).

=== 12 ===
- Nicholas Colasanto, 61, American actor (Cheers), heart attack.
- Malcolm Darroch, 46, Scottish footballer.
- Georges Gautschi, 80, Swiss Olympic figure skater (1924).
- Norman Lesser, 82, New Zealand Anglican prelate.
- Milton E. Lord, 86, American librarian.
- Van Lingle Mungo, 73, American baseball player, heart attack.
- Muzaffer Ozak, 68-69, Turkish poet, composer and Islamic scholar.
- Leslie Sarony, 88, British actor and singer.
- Mahmoud Shokoko, 72, Egyptian actor and entertainer.
- Jerzy Skolimowski, 77, Polish Olympic rower (1928, 1932, 1936).

=== 13 ===
- Jerry Donohue, 64, American chemist, cancer.
- Bo Ehnbom, 85, Swedish general and engineer.
- Gabriel Dubois, 73, French racing cyclist.
- Andrew Gih, 84, Chinese-American evangelist.
- Juliusz Kühl, 71, Polish diplomat.
- Lotte Lang, 85, Austrian actress.
- Jean-Marie Loret, 66, French railway worker, alleged illegitimate son of Adolf Hitler, heart attack.
- Philip Snow, 77, English cricketer.
- Ernie Willett, 65, English footballer.
- Edwin A. Zundel, 91, American general.

=== 14 ===
- Eva Mottley, 31, Barbadian-born British actress, suicide by drug overdose.
- Esko Rekomaa, 52, Finnish ice hockey player.
- Vincent A. Riccio, 65, American politician, member of the New York State Assembly (1969– 1974), heart attack.
- Victor Steinbrueck, 73, American architect, complications during heart surgery.
- Douglas Stewart, 71, Australian poet.
- Francisco Tamayo, 82, Venezuelan botanist.

=== 15 ===
- Filip Bajković, 74, Montenegrin politician, prime minister (1953–1962).
- Carol Brice, 66, American singer, cancer.
- Harold Jefferson Coolidge Jr., 81, American zoologist and conservationist, complications from a fall.
- Charles Theodore Dotter, 64, American radiologist.
- Borys Karnicki, 77, Polish submarine commander.
- Manuel Flores Mora, 61, Uruguayan politician and journalist.
- Leonard Spigelgass, 76, American playwright and screenwriter.
- Aaron Wade, 68, American boxer, heart attack.

=== 16 ===
- Sigfried Asche, 78, German art historian.
- Josephine Bradley, 91, Irish-born English ballroom dancer and dance teacher.
- Fred Pierce Corson, 88, American Methodist prelate, stroke.
- John S. Davis, 86, American football and basketball coach.
- Feredune Dittia, 65-66, Indian cricketer.
- Marian Engel, 51, Canadian novelist (Bear), cancer.
- Paulette Nardal, 88, Martinican writer and journalist.
- Frederick Smith, 3rd Earl of Birkenhead, 48, British writer and hereditary peer, heart attack.
- Larry Ward, 60, American actor.

=== 17 ===
- George Coppard, 87, British soldier.
- Ingerid Dal, 89, Norwegian linguist.
- Newman Ertell, 82, American basketball coach.
- Georg Hegner, 87, Danish Olympic fencer (1920).
- Ebbe Hoff, 78, American physiologist.
- Wanda Perry, 67, American actress.
- Willi Schatz, 80, German dentist and concentration camp official, cancer.
- Marie Seton, 74, British biographer.
- George Washington, 77, American baseball player.

=== 18 ===
- Willy Alberti, 58, Dutch singer.
- Bobo Barnett, 81, American clown.
- Gábor Darvas, 74, Hungarian composer and musicologist.
- Alberta Pierson Hannum, 78, American author.
- Randolph Edgar Haugan, 82, American author and publisher.
- Walter Jarvis, 89, Australian Olympic rower (1924).
- Douglas Johnston, Lord Johnston, 78, Scottish politician and judge, MP (1948–1961).
- Ken Levey, 61, Australian footballer.
- Virginia Manzano, 72, Mexican actress.
- Arthur R. Marshall, 65, American conservationist.
- Lee Mingledorff Jr., 70, American politician, suicide by gunshot.
- Marcel Pesch, 74, Luxembourgish racing cyclist.
- Sir Shuldham Redfern, 89, British colonial administrator.
- Mark Ryan, 60, American politician.
- Ralph Thomas Scurfield, 57, Canadian businessman, avalanche.
- Charles C. Shepard, 70, American microbiologist.
- Otto Tschumi, 80, Swiss painter.
- Arthur H. Wicks, 97, American politician, member of the New York State Senate (1927–1956).
- Thurston Williams, 61, British architect.

=== 19 ===
- Clarence Bell, 70, American basketball player.
- Dorothy Black, 85, South African-British actress.
- Miloslav Blažek, 62, Czechoslovak ice hockey player.
- Nathan Cummings, 88, Canadian-American businessman (Consolidated Foods), heart attack.
- Georges Girard, 97, French bacteriologist.
- Carl Hambro, 70, Norwegian novelist.
- Woody Harris, 73, American songwriter.
- Charles Hoff, 82, Norwegian Olympic athlete (1924).
- Dan Jones, 76, British politician, MP (1959–1983).
- Liubov Kemularia-Nathadze, 94, Soviet Georgian botanist.
- Gregorio López-Bravo, 61, Spanish politician, plane crash.
- Carmen Lucia, 82, American union organizer.
- Nikanor Niesłuchowski, 75, Polish Orthodox prelate.
- Sverre Pettersen, 82, Norwegian footballer.
- Betty Radice, 73, English literary editor, heart attack.
- Pietro Reverberi, 72, Italian basketball referee.
- Donald Rickles, 57, American radio and television announcer, heart attack.
- Trygvi Samuelsen, 77, Faroese politician.
- Katharina Schroth, 90, German physiotherapist.
- Walter Scott, 82, New Zealand educationalist.
- Wilhelm Specht, 77, German mathematician.
- Carol Sutton, 51, American journalist, cancer.
- Raymond Tissot, 65, French Olympic javelin thrower (1948).
- Elaine Watt, 55, American Olympic equestrian (1956).
- Yang Shixian, 88, Chinese chemist.

=== 20 ===
- Ronald Bird, 69, English cricketer.
- Jonas Fjeldstad, 90, Norwegian oceanographer.
- Jack Ford, 79, Australian rugby player.
- Carl Ludwig Franck, 80, German-British architect.
- Syl Johnson, 84, American baseball player.
- Isaac Kashdan, 79, American chess player.
- Silas J. Kloehn, 82, American orthodontist.
- Bhawani Prasad Mishra, 71, Indian poet and author.
- Clarence Nash, 80, American voice actor (Donald Duck), leukemia.
- Nikolay Urvantsev, 92, Soviet geologist.
- Francis O. Wilcox, 76, American diplomat, heart attack.
- William F. Windle, 86, American neurologist, Parkinson's disease.

=== 21 ===
- Jannie Barnard, 40, South African rugby player, traffic collision.
- Ina Claire, 91, American actress, heart attack.
- Miloš Deyl, 78, Czechoslovak botanist.
- Louis Hayward, 75, South African-born British-American actor, lung cancer.
- Tony Janiro, 59, American boxer, kidney failure.
- Roy LeCraw, 89, American politician, stroke.
- Ralph Page, 82, American contra dance caller.
- Nathan Pritikin, 69, American nutritionist, suicide by exsanguination.
- Dermot Ryan, 60, Irish Roman Catholic prelate, heart attack.
- Maurice Smith, 75, English-born Canadian journalist, heart failure.
- Janice Torre, 70, American songwriter ("Paper Roses").
- John G. Trump, 77, American electrical engineer, uncle of Donald Trump.
- Frank Wearne, 71, American racing driver.

=== 22 ===
- Sethu Lakshmi Bayi, 89, Indian Travancorian royal.
- Irene Ibsen Bille, 83, Norwegian novelist and playwright.
- Victor Carlund, 79, Swedish footballer.
- Lucien Cooremans, 85, Belgian politician.
- Jimmy D'Arcy, 63, Northern Irish footballer.
- Salvador Espriu, 71, Spanish poet.
- Sir John Osbaldiston Field, 71, British colonial administrator.
- Peter Firstbrook, 51, Canadian figure skater, pneumonia.
- Ernests Fogels, 74, Soviet Latvian mathematician.
- Aiichirō Fujiyama, 87, Japanese politician.
- Arild Haga, 71, Norwegian revue writer.
- David Hunt, 50-51, British ornithologist, tiger attack.
- Attaher Maïga, 61, Malian politician, plane crash.
- Bice Mizzi, 85, Maltese pianist.
- Army Rhodes, 66, American baseball player.
- Alexander Scourby, 71, American actor (The Big Heat), heart attack.
- Frank Traynor, 57, Australian jazz musician, leukemia.
- Florence Tunks, 93, British nurse and suffragette.
- Efrem Zimbalist, 95, Russian-American violinist and music director.

=== 23 ===
- Erik Andersson, 88, Swedish Olympic water polo player (1920, 1924).
- Charles Breslin, 20, Northern Irish militant (Provisional Irish Republican Army), shot.
- Iris Crooke, 89, New Zealand nurse.
- Andrzej Czarniak, 53, Polish Olympic skier (1952).
- William Greer, 75, Irish-American Secret Service agent, driver during the assassination of John F. Kennedy, cancer.
- Pierre Lafitte Ithurralde, 83, French poet.
- Belford Lawson Jr., 83, American attorney and civil rights activist.
- Choko Mabuchi, 73, Japanese pilot.
- Leo Osiewalski, 63, American basketball player.
- Boyd Tackett, 73, American politician, member of the U.S. House of Representatives (1949–1953).

=== 24 ===
- Nigol Andresen, 85, Soviet Estonian politician.
- Ralph Beals, 83, American anthropologist.
- Jeffrey Dell, 85, British filmmaker.
- Giorgos Giamalis, 77, Greek footballer, heart attack.
- Anna Kael, 77, Hungarian Olympic gymnast (1928).
- Hal C. Kern, 90, American film editor (Gone with the Wind).
- Georges Portmann, 94, French politician and physician.
- Janusz Ślązak, 77, Polish Olympic rower (1928, 1932, 1936).
- Eduard Sperling, 82, German Olympic wrestler (1928, 1932).
- Jorge A. Suárez, 57, Argentine linguist.
- William J. West, 92, Canadian politician.
- Marguerite Wildenhain, 88, French-American artist.

=== 25 ===
- Ahn Sahng-hong, 67, South Korean religious leader (World Mission Society Church of God), stroke.
- Bill Branch, 74, English golfer.
- Bill Diddel, 100, American golfer and golf course designer.
- Charles Reed Laws, 91, New Zealand geologist.
- Marianne Oswald, 84, French singer and actress.
- Harry Poulter, 74, English footballer.
- Ivar Ruste, 68, Norwegian singer.
- Ziyodullo Shahidi, 70, Soviet Tajik musician.
- Ernst Waldschmidt, 87, German Indologist.
- Rudd Weatherwax, 77, American actor and animal trainer (Lassie), respiratory disease.

=== 26 ===
- Albert Turner Bharucha-Reid, 57, American mathematician.
- Eric Chatfield, 84, Australian footballer.
- Charles Gibson Connell, 85, Scottish ornithologist.
- Leonardo David, 24, Italian ski racer, heart attack.
- Santosh Kumar Ghosh, 64, Indian writer and journalist.
- Camillo Giardina, 77, Italian politician.
- Lance Hall, 70, English footballer.
- Tjalling Koopmans, 74, Dutch-American economist, Nobel Prize recipient (1975).
- Ernest Mander, 90, British-Australian psychologist and political activist.
- Douglas Muggeridge, 56, British radio producer.
- Jordanis Pavlides, 81, Greek-British bridge player.
- George Uhle, 86, American baseball player.
- Marko Vego, 78, Yugoslav Bosnian archaeologist.
- Malisa Zini, 63, Argentine actress.

=== 27 ===
- Joseph Buloff, 85, Russian-American actor.
- Ernest Dubac, 71, Yugoslav Croatian football player and manager.
- Ray Ellington, 68, English drummer and singer, cancer.
- David Huffman, 39, American actor, stabbed.
- Jacob Kunstle, 83, American politician, member of the South Dakota Senate (1972).
- Henry Cabot Lodge Jr., 82, American politician and diplomat, member of the U.S. Senate (1937–1944, 1947–1953).
- Sidney McCrory, 73, American politician.
- Sir Iain Moncreiffe, 65, British genealogist and hereditary peer.
- Francisco Monterde, 90, Mexican writer.
- J. Pat O'Malley, 80, English actor (The Jungle Book, Alice in Wonderland, A Touch of Grace), cardiovascular disease.
- Alfred Rosesco, 71, American Olympic handball player (1936).
- Albert Strohschein, 80, Canadian politician.
- Naomi Wing, 81, Australian physician.

=== 28 ===
- Charles Adderley, 72, English cricketer.
- Ferdinand Alquié, 78, French philosopher.
- Percy Andrews, 62, English footballer.
- Anna P. Baker, 56, Canadian artist, cancer.
- Charita Bauer, 61, American actress.
- David Byron, 38, British singer (Uriah Heep), seizure.
- Cliff Coulson, 78, Australian footballer.
- Walter I. Davidson, 89, American politician and civic leader.
- Christine N. Govan, 87, American writer.
- Alberts Ozoliņš, 88, Soviet Latvian Olympic weightlifter (1924).
- D. W. Lucas, 79, English classical scholar.
- Howard Wads Rundquist, 83, American politician, member of the Minnesota House of Representatives (1943–1950).
- David Ryder, 50, Irish Olympic sailor (1960).
- Johan Otto Söderhjelm, 86, Finnish jurist and politician, MP (1933–1939, 1944–1951, 1962–1966).
