= 1915 in association football =

The following are the football (soccer) events of the year 1915 throughout the world.

== Events ==
Several European leagues suspended play because of World War I.

== Winners club national championship ==
- Argentina: Racing Club
- Austria: Wiener AC
- Cuba: Hispano América (La Habana)
- Denmark: B93
- England: Everton F.C.
- Iceland: Fram
- Italy: Genoa 1893
- Luxembourg: US Hollerich
- Netherlands: Sparta Rotterdam
- Paraguay: Cerro Porteño
- Scotland: For fuller coverage, see 1914-15 in Scottish football.
  - Scottish Division One – Celtic
  - Scottish Division Two – Cowdenbeath
  - Scottish Cup – No competition
- Sweden: Djurgårdens IF
- Uruguay: Nacional
- Greece: 1913 to 1921 - no championship titles due to the First World War and the Greco-Turkish War of 1919-1922.

== International tournaments ==
- 1915 Far Eastern Championship Games

(Republic of China (1912–1949)) China

== Births ==
- January 1 – Ray Eastwood, English retired professional footballer (died 1946)
- January 23 – Lance Hall, English professional footballer (died 1985)
- February 20 – Elba de Padua Lima, Brazilian international footballer and coach manager (died 1984)
- February 23 – Heinz Flotho, German international footballer (died 2000)
- March 16 – Wilhelm Simetsreiter, German international footballer (died 2001)
- March 30 – Arsenio Erico, Paraguayan international footballer (died 1977)
- April 11 – Alex Lockie, English professional footballer (died 1974)
- May 7 – George Sadler, English footballer
- June 21 – Karol Miklosz, Polish-Soviet footballer, referee and football administrator (died 2003)
- July 16 – Ike Robinson, English professional footballer (died 1979)
- September 15 – Helmut Schön, German international footballer and manager (died 1996)

== Deaths ==
- November 11 - Robert Barker (footballer)
