= 1914–15 Football League =

27th season of the Football League

The Football League
- Season: 1914–15
- Champions: Everton
- Relegated: Glossop

The 1914–15 season was the 27th season of The Football League. It was the final season before football was suspended at the outbreak of World War I.

== Final league tables ==
Beginning in the 1894–95 season, clubs finishing level on points were separated according to goal average (goals scored divided by goals conceded). In case one or more teams had the same goal difference, this system favoured those teams who had scored fewer goals. The goal average system was eventually scrapped beginning with the 1976–77 season.

During the first six seasons of the league, (up to the 1893–94 season), re-election process concerned the clubs which finished in the bottom four of the league. From the 1894–95 season and until the 1920–21 season the re-election process was required of the clubs which finished in the bottom three of the league.

== First Division ==
First Division
- Season: 1914–15
- Champions: Everton; 2nd English title
- Relegated: Tottenham Hotspur
- Matches: 380
- Goals: 1,201 (3.16 per match)
- Top goalscorer: Bobby Parker (35 goals)
- Biggest home win: The Wednesday 7–0 Bolton Wanderers (1 March 1915)
- Biggest away win: Tottenham Hotspur 0–6 Sunderland (19 December 1914); Aston Villa 1–7 Bolton Wanderers (26 December 1914)
- Highest scoring: Middlesbrough 7–5 Tottenham Hotspur (13 February 1915)

Pos	Team	Pld	W	D	L	GF	GA	GAv	Pts	Relegation
1	Everton (C)	38	19	8	11	76	47	1.617	46	
2	Oldham Athletic	38	17	11	10	70	56	1.250	45	
3	Blackburn Rovers	38	18	7	13	83	61	1.361	43	
4	Burnley	38	18	7	13	61	47	1.298	43	
5	Manchester City	38	15	13	10	49	39	1.256	43	
6	Sheffield United	38	15	13	10	49	41	1.195	43	
7	The Wednesday	38	15	13	10	61	54	1.130	43	
8	Sunderland	38	18	5	15	81	72	1.125	41	
9	Bradford (Park Avenue)	38	17	7	14	69	65	1.062	41	
10	West Bromwich Albion	38	15	10	13	49	43	1.140	40	
11	Bradford City	38	13	14	11	55	49	1.122	40	
12	Middlesbrough	38	13	12	13	62	74	0.838	38	
13	Liverpool	38	14	9	15	65	75	0.867	37	
14	Aston Villa	38	13	11	14	62	72	0.861	37	
15	Newcastle United	38	11	10	17	46	48	0.958	32	
16	Notts County	38	9	13	16	41	57	0.719	31	
17	Bolton Wanderers	38	11	8	19	68	84	0.810	30	
18	Manchester United	38	9	12	17	46	62	0.742	30	
19	Chelsea	38	8	13	17	51	65	0.785	29	
20	Tottenham Hotspur (R)	38	8	12	18	57	90	0.633	28	Relegation to the Second Division

Source: World Football
Rules for classification: 1) Points; 2) Goal average; 3) Goals scored
(C) Champions; (R) Relegated

=== Results ===
Home \ Away	AST	BLB	BOL	BRA	BPA	BUR	CHE	EVE	LIV	MCI	MUN	MID	NEW	NTC	OLD	SHU	SUN	TOT	WED	WBA
Aston Villa		2–1	1–7	0–0	1–2	3–3	2–1	1–5	6–2	4–1	3–3	5–0	2–1	2–1	0–0	1–0	1–3	3–1	0–0	2–1
Blackburn Rovers	1–2		2–2	2–1	2–2	6–0	3–2	2–1	4–2	0–1	3–3	4–0	2–3	5–1	4–1	1–2	3–1	4–1	1–1	2–1
Bolton Wanderers	2–2	3–2		3–5	3–2	3–1	3–1	0–0	0–1	2–3	3–0	4–0	0–0	1–2	2–0	0–1	1–1	4–2	0–3	1–1
Bradford City	3–0	3–0	4–2		3–2	0–0	2–2	0–1	3–2	0–0	4–2	1–1	1–1	3–1	1–0	1–1	3–1	2–2	1–0	5–0
Bradford Park Avenue	2–2	1–2	1–2	3–0		2–2	3–0	1–2	1–0	3–1	5–0	2–0	1–0	3–1	1–1	2–0	2–1	5–1	1–1	1–4
Burnley	2–1	3–2	5–0	0–1	2–0		2–0	1–0	3–0	1–2	3–0	4–0	2–0	0–0	2–3	1–2	2–1	3–1	2–3	0–2
Chelsea	3–1	1–3	2–1	2–0	0–1	1–4		2–0	3–1	0–0	1–3	2–2	0–3	4–1	2–2	1–1	3–0	1–1	0–0	4–1
Everton	0–0	1–3	5–3	1–1	4–1	0–2	2–2		1–3	4–1	4–2	2–3	3–0	4–0	3–4	0–0	7–1	1–1	0–1	2–1
Liverpool	3–6	3–0	4–3	2–1	2–1	3–0	3–3	0–5		3–2	1–1	1–1	2–2	1–1	1–2	2–1	2–1	7–2	2–1	3–1
Manchester City	1–0	1–3	2–1	4–1	2–3	1–0	2–1	0–1	1–1		1–1	1–1	1–1	0–0	0–0	0–0	2–0	2–1	4–0	4–0
Manchester United	1–0	2–0	4–1	1–0	1–2	0–2	2–2	1–2	2–0	0–0		2–2	1–0	2–2	1–3	1–2	3–0	1–1	2–0	0–0
Middlesbrough	1–1	1–4	0–0	3–0	1–3	1–1	3–0	5–1	3–0	1–0	1–1		1–1	1–0	4–1	2–2	2–3	7–5	3–1	2–0
Newcastle United	3–0	2–1	1–2	1–0	1–1	1–2	2–0	0–1	0–0	2–1	2–0	1–2		1–1	1–2	4–3	2–5	4–0	0–0	1–2
Notts County	1–1	1–1	0–0	0–0	1–2	0–0	2–0	0–0	3–1	0–2	4–2	5–1	1–0		2–1	3–1	2–1	1–2	1–2	1–1
Oldham Athletic	3–3	3–2	5–3	1–0	6–2	1–2	0–0	1–1	0–2	0–0	1–0	5–1	1–0	2–0		3–0	4–5	4–1	5–2	1–1
Sheffield United	3–0	1–2	3–1	1–1	3–2	1–0	1–1	1–0	2–1	0–0	3–1	0–1	1–0	1–0	3–0		1–1	1–1	0–1	2–0
Sunderland	4–0	5–1	4–3	1–1	3–3	2–1	2–1	0–3	2–2	0–2	1–0	4–1	2–4	3–1	1–2	3–2		5–0	3–1	1–2
Tottenham Hotspur	0–2	0–4	4–2	0–0	3–0	1–3	1–1	1–3	1–1	2–2	2–0	3–3	0–0	2–0	1–0	1–1	0–6		6–1	2–0
The Wednesday	5–2	1–1	7–0	3–3	6–0	0–0	3–2	1–4	2–1	2–1	1–0	3–1	2–1	0–0	2–2	1–1	1–2	3–2		0–0
West Bromwich Albion	2–0	0–0	3–0	3–0	1–0	3–0	2–0	1–2	4–0	0–1	0–0	1–0	2–0	4–1	0–0	1–1	1–2	3–2	0–0	

Updated to match(es) played on unknown. Source:
Legend: Blue = home team win; Yellow = draw; Red = away team win.

=== Maps ===
Locations of the Football League First Division London teams
Locations of the Football League First Division teams

== Second Division ==
Football League Second Division
- Season: 1914–15
- Champions: Derby County (2nd title)
- Failed re-election: Glossop
- Matches: 380
- Goals: 1,135 (2.99 per match)
- Top goalscorer: Joe Lane (Blackpool), 28
- Biggest home win: Birmingham – Glossop 11–1 (6 Jan 1915)
- Biggest away win: Leicester Fosse – Derby County 0–6 (28 Dec 1914)
- Highest scoring: Birmingham – Glossop 11–1 (6 Jan 1915)

Pos	Team	Pld	W	D	L	GF	GA	GAv	Pts	Promotion or relegation
1	Derby County (C, P)	38	23	7	8	71	33	2.152	53	Promotion to the First Division
2	Preston North End (P)	38	20	10	8	61	42	1.452	50	Promotion to the First Division
3	Barnsley	38	22	3	13	51	51	1.000	47	
4	Wolverhampton Wanderers	38	19	7	12	77	52	1.481	45	
5	Arsenal (P)	38	19	5	14	69	41	1.683	43 (Note: The official Football League records originally showed Birmingham in 5th place and Arsenal in 6th place. In 1975 it was discovered that an error in the calculation of Goal Average had been made and the table was corrected.)	Promotion to the First Division
6	Birmingham	38	17	9	12	62	39	1.590	43	
7	Hull City	38	19	5	14	65	54	1.204	43	
8	Huddersfield Town	38	17	8	13	61	42	1.452	42	
9	Clapton Orient	38	16	9	13	50	48	1.042	41	
10	Blackpool	38	17	5	16	58	57	1.018	39	
11	Bury	38	15	8	15	61	56	1.089	38	
12	Fulham	38	15	7	16	53	47	1.128	37	
13	Bristol City	38	15	7	16	62	56	1.107	37	
14	Stockport County	38	15	7	16	54	60	0.900	37	
15	Leeds City	38	14	4	20	65	64	1.016	32	
16	Lincoln City	38	11	9	18	46	65	0.708	31	
17	Grimsby Town	38	11	9	18	48	76	0.632	31	
18	Nottingham Forest	38	10	9	19	43	77	0.558	29	
19	Leicester Fosse	38	10	4	24	47	88	0.534	24	Re-elected
20	Glossop (R)	38	6	6	26	31	87	0.356	18	Failed re-election and demoted

(C) Champions; (P) Promoted; (R) Relegated

=== Results ===
Home \ Away	ARS	BAR	BIR	BLP	BRI	BRY	CLA	DER	FUL	GLP	GRI	HUD	HUL	LEE	LEI	LIN	NOT	PNE	STP	WOL
Arsenal		1–0	1–0	2–0	3–0	3–1	2–1	1–2	3–0	3–0	6–0	0–3	2–1	2–0	6–0	1–1	7–0	1–2	3–1	5–1
Barnsley	1–0		2–1	1–2	2–1	2–0	1–0	1–0	2–2	2–0	0–0	1–0	1–0	2–1	1–0	3–1	3–0	2–1	2–0	2–1
Birmingham	3–0	2–0		3–0	1–1	1–0	1–0	0–2	1–0	11–1	3–0	1–0	2–2	6–3	2–0	2–0	3–0	1–1	0–1	1–2
Blackpool	0–2	1–1	3–1		2–0	3–4	5–1	2–1	2–2	3–0	5–0	3–2	1–2	1–0	1–2	0–0	3–0	0–2	4–2	1–0
Bristol City	1–1	3–1	2–3	2–1		1–0	3–0	2–3	0–0	3–1	7–0	0–1	5–2	1–0	1–0	2–1	1–2	4–0	0–2	0–1
Bury	3–1	1–2	1–3	2–2	2–1		3–0	2–0	1–0	5–0	2–2	3–1	0–1	0–0	3–1	1–1	4–2	0–0	2–1	4–1
Clapton Orient	1–0	4–2	1–1	2–0	2–0	2–2		0–1	2–1	5–2	2–1	3–1	0–3	2–0	2–0	3–1	0–0	1–1	3–0	1–1
Derby County	4–0	7–0	1–0	5–0	1–0	2–1	0–3		1–1	1–1	1–1	1–0	4–1	1–2	1–0	3–0	1–0	2–0	1–0	3–1
Fulham	0–1	2–0	2–3	0–1	1–2	6–3	4–0	2–0		2–0	2–1	2–3	4–1	1–0	1–0	3–1	2–1	0–2	1–0	0–1
Glossop	0–4	0–1	3–3	1–3	2–1	3–0	3–1	1–1	1–0		0–0	2–2	0–5	0–3	2–3	1–2	1–0	0–1	1–1	0–2
Grimsby Town	1–0	2–3	1–0	2–0	2–3	1–0	2–1	1–2	1–1	1–0		0–0	1–1	2–5	1–0	5–1	4–0	2–2	6–1	1–4
Huddersfield Town	3–0	1–0	0–0	5–0	5–3	0–1	1–1	0–0	2–2	0–1	3–1		1–0	1–0	3–1	0–1	4–0	3–1	2–1	2–0
Hull City	1–0	2–1	0–0	1–3	1–1	3–1	0–1	1–0	2–0	2–0	4–1	0–4		2–6	2–1	6–1	3–1	0–1	1–0	5–1
Leeds City	2–2	0–2	2–0	2–0	1–1	2–1	0–1	3–5	0–1	3–0	5–0	1–0	2–3		7–2	3–1	4–0	0–0	1–3	2–3
Leicester Fosse	1–4	0–1	1–0	2–2	1–3	1–3	1–1	0–6	0–2	3–2	2–0	1–2	1–1	5–1		2–2	3–1	2–3	5–4	0–3
Lincoln City	1–0	3–0	0–1	0–1	3–1	2–3	1–0	0–0	3–1	2–1	2–1	1–1	0–3	0–1	2–3		2–1	3–1	2–2	2–2
Nottingham Forest	1–1	2–1	1–1	2–1	0–1	1–1	0–1	2–2	2–2	1–0	4–2	3–2	1–0	3–1	1–3	3–2		1–1	1–1	3–1
Preston North End	3–0	5–2	2–0	1–0	4–1	2–0	2–2	1–3	2–1	1–0	3–0	1–1	2–1	2–0	1–0	0–0	2–2		2–0	5–3
Stockport County	1–1	1–2	3–1	0–2	2–2	1–0	2–0	3–2	0–2	2–1	1–1	2–1	3–0	3–1	3–0	1–0	1–0	2–1		2–2
Wolverhampton Wanderers	1–0	4–1	0–0	2–0	2–2	1–1	0–0	0–1	2–0	4–0	0–1	4–1	1–2	5–1	7–0	3–1	5–1	2–0	4–1	

Updated to match(es) played on unknown. Source: Ian Laschke: Rothmans Book of Football League Records 1888–89 to 1978–79. Macdonald and Jane’s, London & Sydney, 1980.
Legend: Blue = home team win; Yellow = draw; Red = away team win.

=== Maps ===
Locations of the Football League Second Division London teams
Locations of the Football League Second Division teams

== Attendances ==
=== First Division ===
#	Football club	Home games	Average attendance
1	Manchester City	19	20,205
2	Chelsea FC	19	18,540
3	Everton FC	19	18,530
4	Liverpool FC	19	16,805
5	The Wednesday	19	16,120
6	Sheffield United	19	14,735
7	Newcastle United	19	14,545
8	Aston Villa	19	13,680
9	Bolton Wanderers	19	13,580
10	Bradford City	19	13,365
11	Tottenham Hotspur	19	13,270
12	Bradford FC	19	13,195
13	Blackburn Rovers	19	12,740
14	Manchester United	19	11,950
15	Burnley FC	19	11,415
16	West Bromwich Albion	19	10,945
17	Sunderland AFC	19	10,230
18	Notts County	19	9,970
19	Middlesbrough FC	19	9,060
20	Oldham Athletic	19	9,045

== See also ==
- 1914-15 in English football
- 1914 in association football
- 1915 in association football
