= COVID-19 pandemic in Malta =

- Disease: COVID-19
- Pathogen: SARS-CoV-2
- Location: Malta
- First outbreak: Wuhan, Hubei, China
- Index case: Valletta
- Arrival date: 7 March 2020 (6 years, 5 months, 2 weeks and 3 days)
- Confirmed cases: 121,034
- Active cases: 136
- Recovered: 119,631
- Deaths: 871
- Fatality rate: 0.72%
- Vaccinations: 1,550,000

Government website
- deputyprimeminister.gov.mt/en/health-promotion/covid-19/Pages/landing-page.aspx

The COVID-19 pandemic in Malta was a part of the worldwide pandemic of coronavirus disease 2019 (COVID-19) caused by severe acute respiratory syndrome coronavirus 2 (SARS-CoV-2). The first case of the disease in Malta was an Italian 12-year-old girl on 7 March 2020. The girl and her family were in isolation, as required by those following the Maltese health authority's guidelines who were in Italy or other highly infected countries. Later, both her parents were found positive as well.

A mandatory quarantine was imposed on travellers and those who were possibly in contact with those who travelled abroad. A mandatory lockdown was imposed on those over the age of 65 or those with chronic health conditions. WHO praised the Maltese government's response to the pandemic, before the number of cases rose to 52 on 7 April. On May Day, because the reproductive rate of the virus was below 0, the first relaxation of some measures were announced.

Malta's second wave of the virus, which was more severe, began in the summer of 2020.

On 12 May 2021, the Minister for Health, Chris Fearne, stated that Malta would be the first EU country to open up the vaccine to its population of over 16 years of age. On 25 May 2021, Fearne announced that 70% of the Maltese population had become fully vaccinated, making it the first nation in the world to reach the minimum estimated benchmark for herd immunity against the virus.

As of 31 December 2023, Malta had reported 121,034 confirmed cases, 119,631 recoveries and 871 deaths, while 136 cases remained active.

As of 4 February 2023, a total of 1,279,922 vaccine doses have been administered.

== Background ==
On 12 January 2020, the World Health Organization (WHO) confirmed that a novel coronavirus was the cause of a respiratory illness in a cluster of people in Wuhan City, Hubei Province, China, which was reported to the WHO on 31 December 2019. Early in the pandemic, it was noted that the case fatality ratio for COVID-19 was much lower than SARS of 2003 but that the transmission was significantly greater and would thus lead to a significant total death toll.

== Timeline ==
On 7 March, Malta reported its first three cases of coronavirus: an Italian family consisting of a 12-year-old girl and her parents, who arrived in Malta on 3 March from Rome after a holiday in Trentino. The girl was the first case, with the parents testing positive for the coronavirus later in the day. They had been in self-quarantine since arriving from Italy, and they were held in isolation at Mater Dei Hospital.

On 23 March, the total number of confirmed cases in the country crossed over 100 as another seventeen new cases were reported.

The first death due to COVID-19 in Malta was reported on 8 April in a press-conference held by the Minister for Health & Superintendent of Public Health. The deceased was a 92-year-old woman from Gozo.

On 8 August, the total number of confirmed cases in the country crossed over 1000. On 2 December, the total number of confirmed cases in the country crossed over 10,000.

In May 2021, Malta became the first EU country to open up the vaccine to the entire population. On 25 May 2021, the Minister for Health announced that 70% of the Maltese population had become fully vaccinated, making it the first nation in the world to reach the minimum estimated benchmark for herd immunity against the virus.

== Government response ==
=== Health and precautions ===
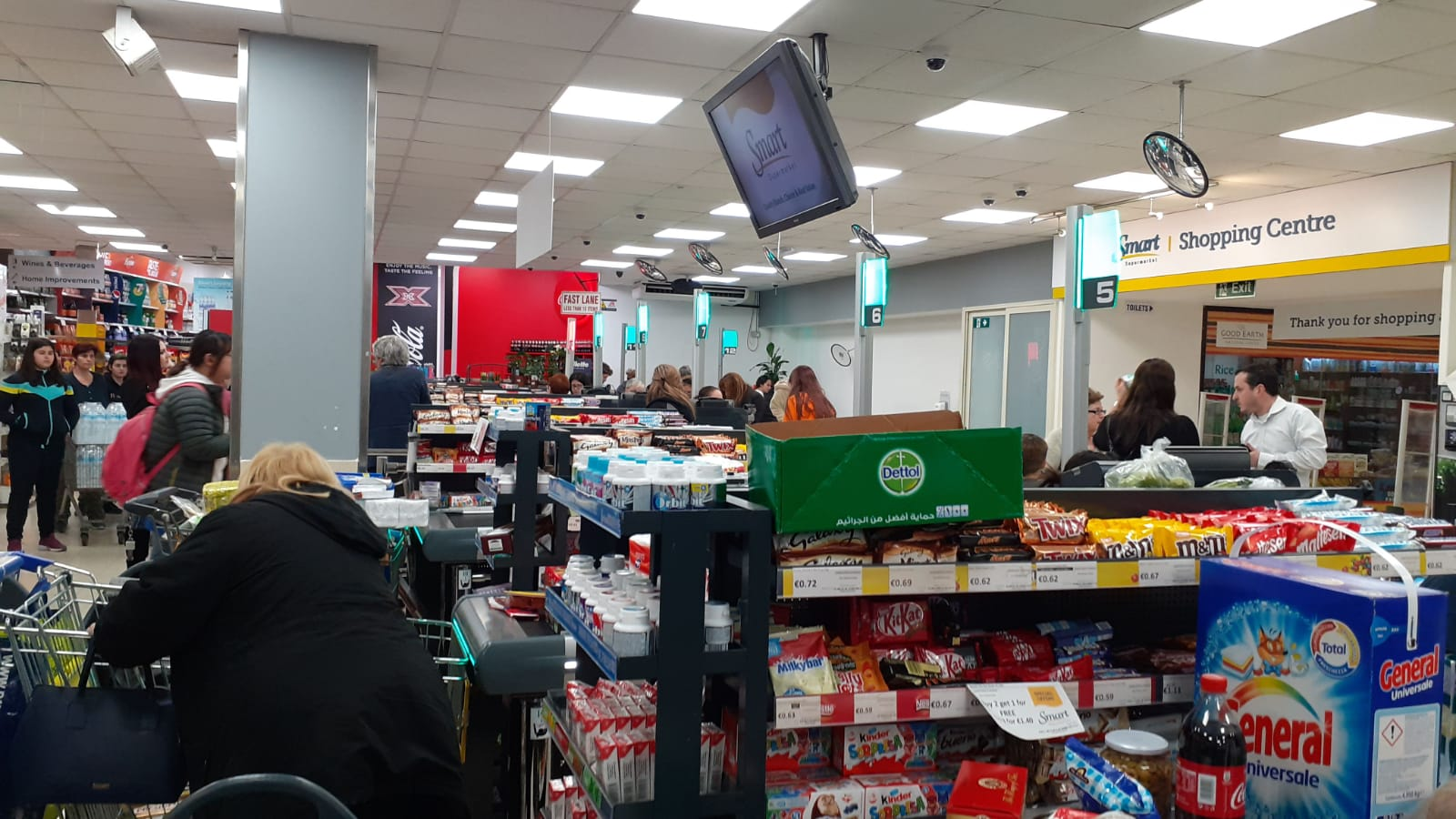
Queues at Smart supermarket in Birkirkara on 24 February 2020

On 24 January 2020, the Superintendent for Public Health, Charmaine Gauci, predicted low exposure due to no direct flights between Malta and China.

On 24 February, the health authorities announced that all passengers arriving in Malta were to be screened by thermal cameras; two thermal scanning devices were installed in Malta International Airport. Passengers disembarking from vessels at the Grand Harbour and catamaran terminal in Marsa were also scanned. At Mater Dei Hospital, all patients with respiratory symptoms were checked for COVID-19.

On 25 February, the Ministry for Health recommended travellers coming from Italy to self-quarantine for 14 days and for all citizens not to travel to regions of Italy affected by the outbreak. As the Italy coronavirus pandemic proceeded south with the first case discovered in Palermo, panic buying ensued and supermarkets were emptied.

Maltese chandlers and ship workers refused to board vessels from Italy to unload cargo, unless they were provided supervision and clearance by medical doctors. The Malta Union of Teachers recommended members not to accept any homework from students who were unwell and requested students and teachers who visited countries affected by the virus to stay home.

Some work places requested their staff who recently returned from Italy to work from home as well as deferred non-essential travels to Italy.

On 11 March, a travel ban has been placed on trips to Germany, France, Spain and Switzerland, in addition to the ban on trips to Italy, which had been placed on 9 March. Additionally anyone travelling back from mentioned countries must follow a mandatory self-quarantine. Disobeying the order makes the individuals subject to a €1,000 fine.

==== Hunting controversy ====
Most activities were banned in Malta in early 2020 and violators risked being fined for public health risks. Although the government allowed the hunting season to commence, the Public Health Superintendent left the decision to a government-set committee, which allowed it. This increased pressure on police and health authorities. Several illegal activities related to hunting were reported with no police presence. As soon as police were informed of individual illegal activities, the individuals were tipped off and left the scene with protected birds in non-hunting protected zones. In the midst of the pandemic, the Cabinet at Castille had a closed door meeting with hunting lobby over permanently sealing off natural reserves from the public and allowing access only to registered hunters.

=== Measures for containment ===
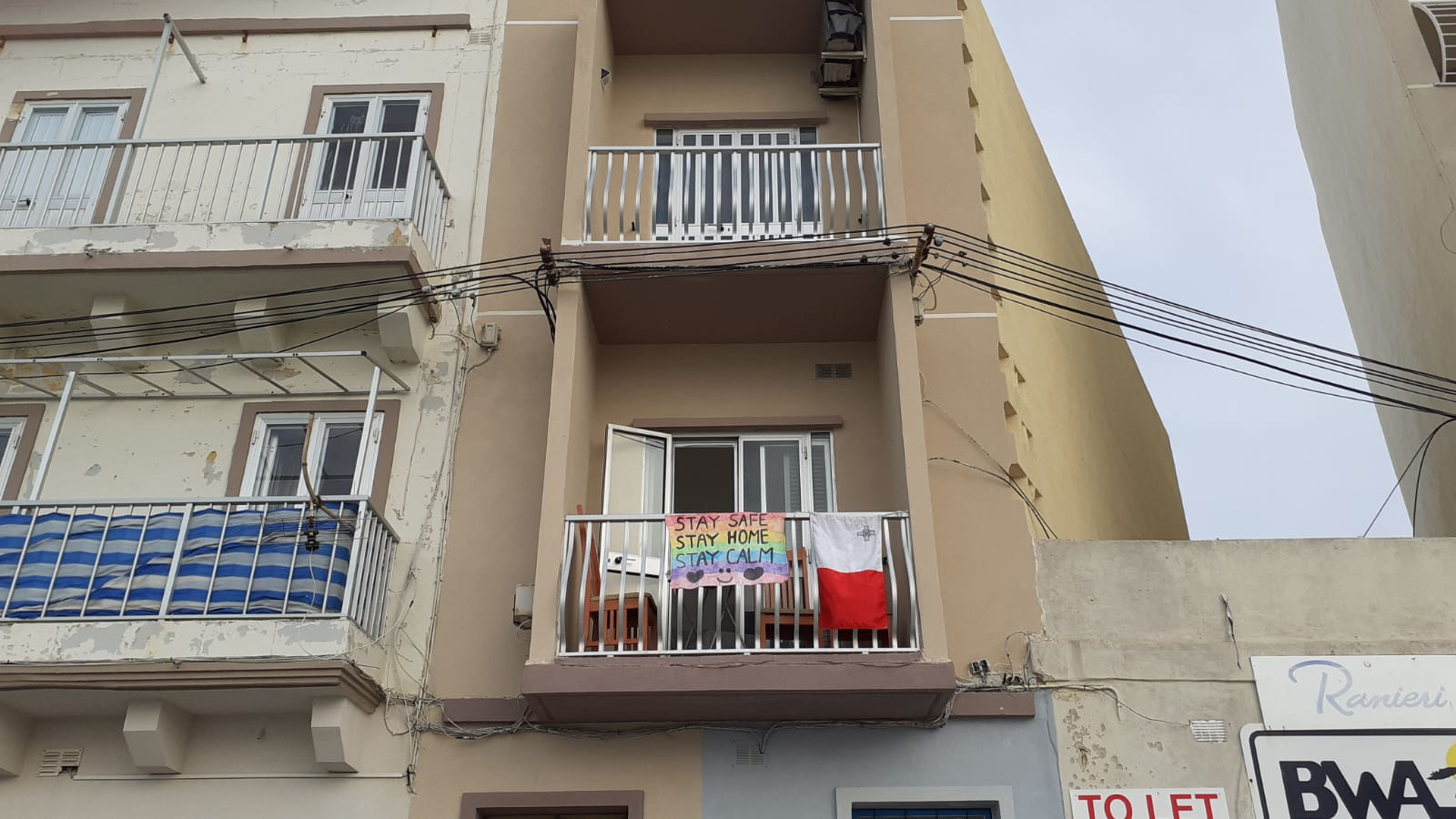
"Stay Home" banner promoted by children, and the display of the flag of Malta as promoted by organisations and the government

On 11 March, Prime Minister Robert Abela announced a ban on all sea and air travel (except for cargo) and a mandatory quarantine on travellers returning from the most infested countries of France, Germany, Switzerland and Spain from that day onwards, together with Italy, for which it applied for the previous 14 days. Infringements were to be penalised with a €1,000 each time.

On 12 March, the Prime Minister announced a number of measures including:

1. Closure of all schools, university and childcare centres for a week;
2. Closure of day centres for the elderly;
3. Stop religious activities unless absolutely necessary;
4. Television channel TVM2 will be transmitting religious activities in agreement with the Archbishop;
5. All football games to be played behind closed doors. Other matches were postponed;
6. No political activities.

On 13 March, mandatory quarantine was extended to travellers returning from any country. This was also published on the Malta Tourism Authority's and Air Malta's websites.

Following reports from spot checks, Malta tripled its mandatory quarantine fine to €3,000 each time since 16 March. Later on in the evening, Abela informed the nation that all gyms, bars and restaurants would temporarily close. Food and Beverage outlets were to be allowed to operate only if they were offering take away and/or delivery service.

On 22 March, Minister for Health Chris Fearne announced three more measures:

- closure of non-essential retail (fashion, appliances, electronics)
- closure of non-essential services (hairdressers, nail salons, beauticians, spas)
- banning of all organised group gatherings.

Any infringements were to be charged with a €3,000 fine each time.

On the evening of 23 March, the Maltese government raised the fine for those infected up to €10,000.

On 28 March, the government announced decisions related to education institutions and exams. These included:

- Schools and educational institutions will be closed until the end of the scholastic year. Online teaching is being used for continuity.
- The SEC examinations (ordinary levels) will not be held in the session beginning on 23 April. MATSEC will then issue a certificate to successful students, showing whether Level 2 or Level 3 was reached based on performance and mid-year mock exams. This certificate will be instrumental in deciding whether to allow students to progress further education. Intermediate and A Level exams will be held in September 2020.

On 16 October, due to a massive spike in cases, the Maltese Government announced new measures that would go into effect on 19 October. These were:

- Entertainment and catering establishments, including bars and każini must close at 11pm.
- Wearing of facemasks is compulsory in all public places and workplaces bar certain exceptions. (Note: This measure entered into force from 17 October but one week grace period was given before fines will be dished out by law enforcement officers.)
- Children under 3 exempt from wearing a mask, as will those with respiratory conditions. The mask may not be worn when someone is travelling alone in their private car, while performing physical activity or in circumstances where lip reading is a necessity.
- The wearing of face masks to be obligatory for all students at all times in primary schools.
- All previous measures on public gatherings and social distancing remain in force.

On 10 March 2021, following 510 new reported cases, the Maltese Government announced new measures that would go into effect on 11 March. These were:

- Schools to close on Monday and lessons shift online
- Non-essential shops, restaurants, cafes, bars, casinos and services closed from tomorrow
- Childcare centres to close from Monday
- All ancillary services in hotels will be shut
- Gozo travel restricted to essential travel and to those who own property there
- Public group gatherings will be limited to 4 people
- All organised sport activities are suspended
- Pools, gyms, museums, theatres and cinemas will close
- No weddings can be held
- Religious services, including mass are cancelled
- Funerals will continue being held according to existing protocols
- Non-urgent operations at hospital are postponed

On 5 August 2021, the Maltese Government announced a number of new measures, these were that:

- Vaccinated people in contact with COVID-19 cases only have to quarantine for seven days.
- Outdoor seated events capacity to increase to 300 from 16 August
- Pregnant women are encouraged to take the COVID-19 vaccine
- Additional COVID-19 vaccine booster planned for September for elderly care homes and those immunocompromised
- Standing events are off-limits for time being

On 9 December 2021, Minister for Health Chris Fearne announced that as of 11 December, mask wearing would be obligatory in all public places, regardless of whether they were indoors or outdoors, as well as if an individual was on their own. Furthermore, he also announced that the COVID-19 booster shot could be taken after only 4 months of the second dose being taken, as opposed to the previous time of 6 months. In addition to this, he also announced that as of 14 December, children between the ages of 5 and 11 were to be eligible to receive the COVID-19 vaccination.

On 23 December 2021, following more than 3000 new cases in the preceding week, the Maltese Government announced new measures that would go into effect on 27 December. These were:

- All organised standing events have to be seated
- Funerals and weddings to continue with existing protocols
- Establishments have to close at 1am
- Sports events can continue, but without spectators
- Reduction in visiting hours at Mater Dei Hospital

Only a week later, on 31 December, due to the incredibly large number of cases of COVID-19, the Government announced that as of 10 January 2022, schools would reopen online, with the University of Malta deciding on whether to hold lectures online or in person as per each faculty's discretion.

=== Arriving Migrants ===
As of 16 August, Malta no longer reported arriving migrant cases in the official figures as per ECDC direction, due to this (on of the aforementioned date) 105 cases were removed from the official figures.

On 17 August, authorities provided information that out of the 105 migrant cases, 44 have recovered while 61 still remain active.

On 28 August, in a press briefing it was announced that from a group of newly arrived migrants, 2 were infected with the virus, bringing the total of arriving migrant cases to 107.

On 31 August, in a press release it was confirmed that another 32 migrants tested positive for COVID-19. There are now 139 cases linked to arriving migrants, 44 have recovered while 95 remain active.

On 3 September 10 migrants residing in closed centres were tested positive during the last 24 hours.

On 4 September 27 migrants residing in closed centres were tested positive during the last 24 hours.

On 10 September, A theory floated to explain the WHO discrepancy is that its analysts counted the Sudanese man who died while trying to escape a detention centre on 2 September among Malta's COVID-19 deaths. Sources told Times of Malta that while the deceased had tested positive for COVID-19, his death was caused by other factors related to his escape attempt and was not linked to his viral infection. An inquiry into the circumstances leading to the man's death is under way.

On 17 September, WHO has corrected their deaths figures for Malta, they now reflect the official count.

On 21 September, 5 migrants who reside in closed centres tested positive in the last 24 hours.

=== Vaccination ===
Malta has one of the highest levels of COVID-19 vaccination in the European Union as of the end of September 2021.

== Notable deaths ==
- Fr. Lino Cardona (76, priest and teacher)
- Fr. Edward Mercieca (80, Jesuit priest)
- Fr. Robbie Wirth (86, Jesuit priest)
- Renald Falzon (46, mayor of Qormi)
- Cynthia Turner (88, pianist)
- Godfrey Grima (79, veteran journalist and political commentator)
- Rosalie Freestone-Bayes (77, sister of former PN President, Frank Portelli)

== Statistics ==
The charts below are based on the data collected by the Ministry of Health of Malta, as per the actual dates.

Cumulative confirmed, active, recovered cases and deaths

New cases per day

Recoveries per day

Deaths per day

Cumulative number of vaccinations

Number of cases by age and gender

Number of cases by age

Number of cases by gender

== See also ==
- COVID-19 pandemic by country and territory
- COVID-19 pandemic in Europe
