= World Mission Society Church of God =

Christian new religious movement

World Mission Society Church of God 하나님의교회 세계복음선교협회
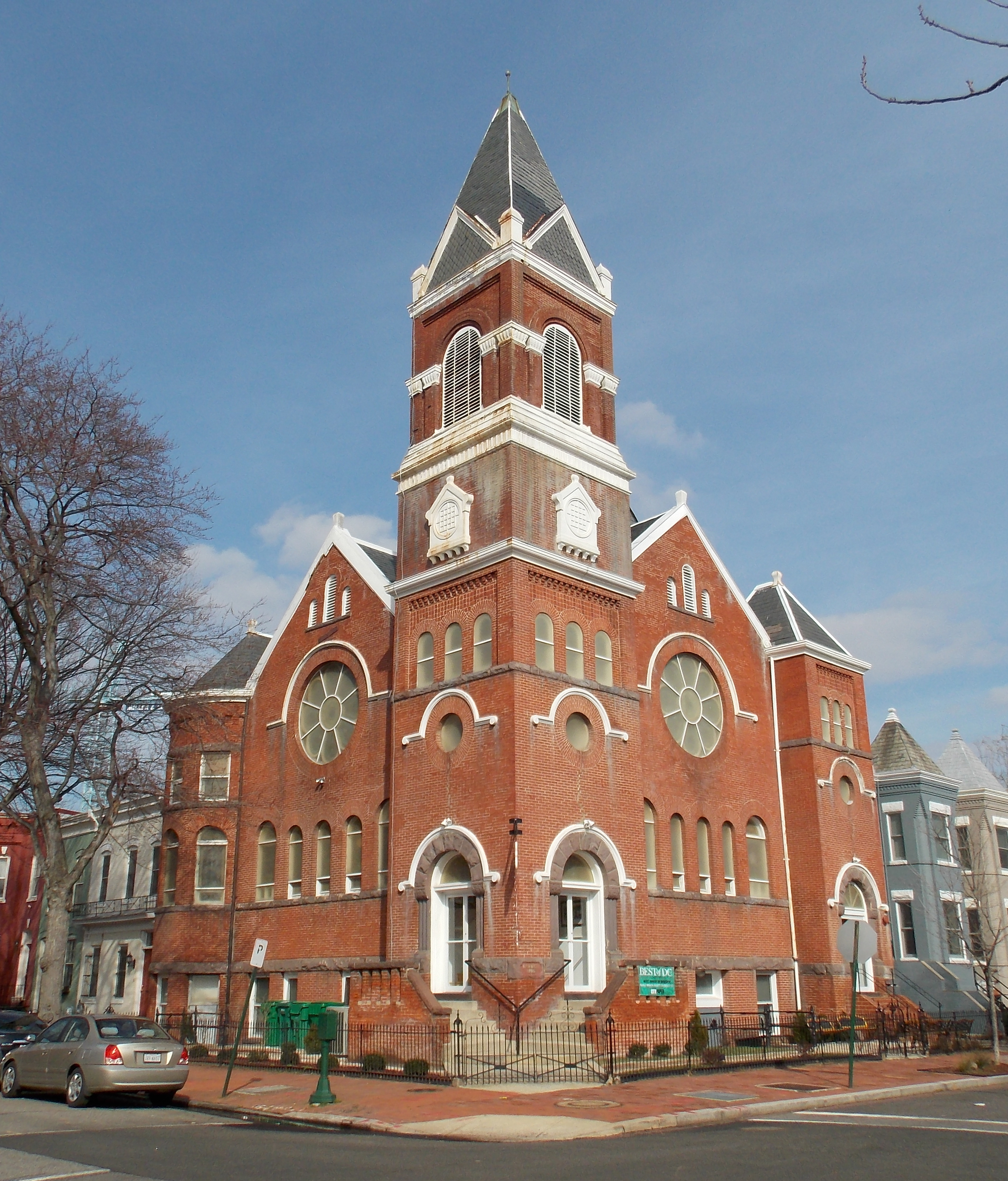
- A 2011 acquired church building in the US at Capitol Hill, Washington, D.C.
- Abbreviation: WMSCOG
- Classification: Christian new religious movement
- Orientation: Restorationist
- Theology: New Covenant
- General Pastor: Kim Joo-Cheol
- God the Mother: Zahng Gil-jah
- Region: Worldwide
- Headquarters: "WMC Building" (37.3804°N 127.1175°E) in Sunae, Bundang, 25 km southeast of Seoul center, Korea
- Founder: Ahn Sahng-hong
- Origin: 28 April 1964; 62 years ago South Korea
- Separated from: "Church of God" on 2 June 1985
- Other names: "Church of God", "Witnesses of Ahn Sahng-hong Church of God"
- Official website: watv.org
- Slogan: We Love You
- Main church is the 2014 acquired "New Jerusalem Pangyo Temple" (37.3839°N 127.1087°E), also in Bundang, 25 km southeast of Seoul center

The World Mission Society Church of God is a Christian non-denominational church established by Ahn Sahng-hong in South Korea in 1964. Ex-members and several cult experts have described it as a cult. (Note: See:) The church believes that founder Ahn Sahng-hong is the Second Coming of Jesus, and that Zahng Gil-jah is God incarnate, in the form of "God the Mother". Its headquarters as well as its main church are located in Sungnam City, Kyunggi Province, near Seoul.

== History ==
=== Founding ===
Ahn Sahng-hong founded the Church of God in South Korea on 28 April 1964. During his lifetime, there were 13 branches, and the headquarters were located in Busan. After Ahn Sahng-hong died on 25 February 1985, a general assembly of all the church leaders was held in Busan on 4 March 1985. In this meeting, they recognized Kim Joo-cheol as Ahn Sahng-hong's successor and Zahng Gil-jah as Ahn Sahng-hong's spiritual bride. The headquarters were moved from Busan to Seoul on 22 March. However, in April, leaders of 2 out of 13 churches opposed the doctrine of the spiritual bride and split. They formed the minority group NCPCOG. The majority group of 11 churches, led by Kim Joo-cheol, held a meeting in Seoul on 2 June 1985. During this meeting, they affirmed two major doctrines: that Ahn Sahng-hong should be regarded as the Second Coming of Christ and Zahng Gil-jah should be regarded as God the Mother. They also changed the church's name to Witnesses of Ahn Sahng-hong Church of God. Around 1997, the Witnesses of Ahn Sahng-hong Church of God established a non-profit organization titled the World Mission Society Church of God for the purpose of registering and managing the organization's assets.

=== 1988 doomsday prophecy ===
In his 1980 book The Mystery of God and the Spring of the Water of Life, Ahn Sahng-hong predicted that the world would end in 1988, 40 years after the independence of Israel in 1948, citing Matthew 24:32–34.

In 1985, a reporter from a Christian magazine interviewed the church about the year 1988. When he asked if the end would come after the 1988 Olympics, they replied that they did not know the specific date. When asked if there was any need to continue working and earning money, given the prediction of the world ending in 1988, the church members responded that people should keep working while waiting.

According to Korean Christian heresy researchers, members of the church gathered on a mountain in Sojeong-myeon, Yeongi County, South Chungcheong Province, to prepare for the coming of Christ Ahn Sahng-hong and the salvation of 144,000 souls. In 1988, during the Seoul Olympics, church members preached that the world would end by the end of that year.

The church later claimed that the year 1988 as a symbolic fulfillment of Jonah's prophecy, suggesting a delay in Christ's return. In Ahn Sahng-hong's final book, The Bridegroom Was a Long Time in Coming, and They All Became Drowsy and Fell Asleep (published in 1985), Ahn Sahng-hong emphasized that the prophecy about the bridegroom coming late cannot be fulfilled without fixed time for his coming. He referred to 1988 as a prophetic moment where the bridegroom's coming might be delayed and compared this to Jonah's prophecy that Nineveh would be overthrown in forty days, which did not occur.

==== Legal proceedings ====
In 2017, at least two members of the South Korean group Hapimo accused the church of defrauding members to accumulate wealth by falsely predicting the end of the world in 1988, 1999, and 2012. After a police investigation, the case lacked sufficient evidence and concrete testimonies of harm, resulting in no charges. The case was forwarded to prosecutors, who ultimately dismissed it, determining that there were no clear elements to establish fraud.

== Beliefs ==
=== Major figures ===
==== Ahn Sahng-hong ====
The church believes Ahn Sahng-hong is the Second Coming of Jesus Christ, therefore, before the last judgment, Christ must appear a second time to restore the truth of the early Church. They believe that Ahn Sahng-hong restored the truth of the early Church and fulfilled the biblical prophecies about the Second Coming of Christ including the time and place.

Regarding the Trinity, they believe that God the Father, God the Son, and the Holy Spirit are one and the same God. Therefore, Ahn Sahng-hong is God the Father, God the Son, and consequently also God the Holy Spirit. They conduct prayers in the name of Ahn Sahng-hong instead of the name of Jesus Christ. They believe that just as Christians prayed in the name of Jesus after He came as the Christ, they now pray in the name of the Second Coming Christ.

==== Zahng Gil-jah ====
The church believes Zahng Gil-jah, to be God, in the form of "God the Mother", a female image of God. They believe that there are two images of God: God the Father and God the Mother. They base this doctrine on the Hebrew plural word Elohim which refers to God, and on Genesis 1:26-27, where God created humans in God's image, both male and female. They also cite New Testament passages, such as 'our Mother' in Galatians 4:26 and 'the Spirit and the Bride' in Revelation 21:2,9 and Revelation 22:17, as evidence of the existence of God the Mother.

=== Traditions ===
==== Passover ====
The church teaches that keeping the Lord's Supper on Passover is a biblically supported Christian tradition, primarily citing John 6:53, where Jesus says, "Whoever eats my flesh and drinks my blood has eternal life", and Matthew 26:26, where, during the Passover, He gives the bread and wine as His body and blood. They argue that the Passover ceremony represents the new covenant, which grants forgiveness of sins and eternal life. The church celebrates the resurrection on the Sunday after celebrating Passover.

They also cite Polycrates and Polycarp, known as the Quartodecimans, as the basis for the early church's practice of keeping the Lord's Supper on Passover. The Quartodecimans were likely considered 'orthodox' among Christians in Palestine and Asia Minor during the early church history. However, after the Paschal Controversy and the First Council of Nicaea, they were classified as heretical. Most Christian churches do not observe Passover, considering it part of the Old Testament law.

==== Saturday Sabbath ====
The church observes Saturday worship as the Sabbath, based on Genesis 2:1, which states that the Sabbath is the seventh day. The reason for keeping the Sabbath is that it is the fourth commandment of the Ten Commandments, with both Jesus and the apostles observing it, as noted in Luke 4, Acts 17 and 18.

The church observes the Sabbath from sunrise on Saturday, following the teachings of its founder, Ahn Sang-hong. This practice differs from that of the Seventh-day Adventist Church, which observes the Sabbath from Friday sunset to Saturday sunset.

==== Women's Veil in Worship ====
The church teaches that, while praying or worshiping, women should cover their heads with a veil and men should not cover their heads, according to their interpretation of 1 Corinthians 11:3-4. They argue that this differs from Catholic practice, where priests wear head coverings like the mitre.

==== Non-observance of Christmas ====
The church does not observe Christmas on 25 December. They claim 25 December did not originate from the Bible, but rather from the Roman festival of Sol Invictus (the Unconquered Sun), coinciding with the winter solstice. They also claim that traditions associated with 25 December, such as decorating trees and Santa Claus, lack any basis in Scripture. The church views the celebration of Christmas as a human tradition, referencing the warning in Matthew 15.

=== Idolatry ===
The church states that according to its interpretation of Exodus 20:4–5, items such as crosses and statues are considered a form of idolatry and are not erected on or in their churches.

==== Stained glass windows ====
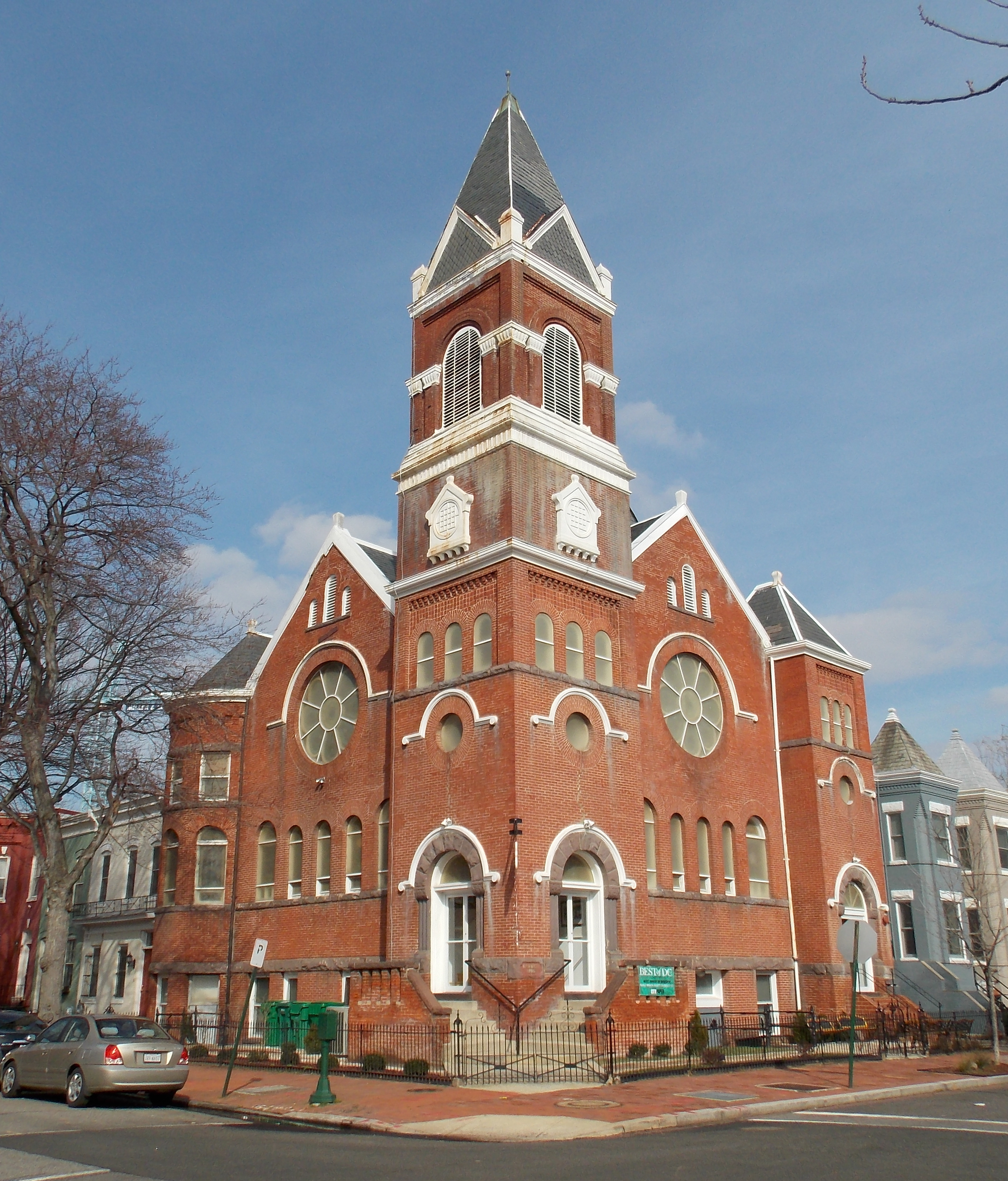
The Church installed storm windows over the stained glass windows.

According to the Washington City Newspaper in 2012, the church removes all stained glass windows from churches it uses, claiming that images made of light, like those cast from stained glass windows, are rooted in sun worship. This caused a lawsuit in Washington, D.C., after the church purchased a historically preserved building and attempted to remove the historically preserved stained glass windows.

After purchasing the Capitol Hill church, the church removed the windows in an attempt to replace them with clear glass. Concerned residents contacted the Historic Preservation Office (HPO), which contacted the church and was informed that the windows had not been removed. After residents provided evidence that the windows had in fact been removed, the church responded by filing an application with the HPO to replace the stained glass windows, citing their religious beliefs, as well as concerns about lead safety and energy efficiency. The D.C. government ruled that the church had created a conflict between preservation laws and its religious freedom by failing to conduct due diligence before purchasing the building. They ordered the restoration of the stained glass windows.

After the restoration, the church applied for a permit to install storm window over the stained glass and the HPO found that regulations did not prohibit the installation of storm windows and that a permit was not required. The church then installed storm windows.

== Evangelism and recruitment ==
Members travel from house to house, in shopping malls, and in college campuses to proselytize for the church. A church member noted they sometimes approach students on their way to their cars, claiming they attempted to approach students in open, visibly safe areas. Some ex-members have described the group's recruiting efforts as very aggressive, saying that it targets vulnerable people, especially those going through a major life transition or with a void in their lives. They have also said the group targets those with greater access to money, including particularly college students and returning veterans. Recruiters have been known to ask students, especially women, if they would like to join Bible study groups, sometimes preceded by asking them if they believe in a female god ("God the Mother"). They have also been criticized as targeting women and ethnic minorities.

The church evangelizes mainly by inviting people to join Bible study groups. If the target is a young woman, they are often asked whether they believe in a female god before being invited. Their behaviour has been described as "insistent". Former members claim that young, wealthy Caucasians and those who appear psychologically vulnerable are targeted, although the church denies this. Viral social media posts accuse them of human trafficking, but this has not been substantiated.

In September 2021, a writer from Auckland University's student magazine Craccum published an article stating that the Elohim Academy was conducting door-knocking evangelism campaigns in Wellington and Auckland, with an emphasis on recruiting young women. The article also reported claims from an anonymous female former member, who claimed that members were expected to follow strict rules, such as separating themselves from social media and non-church friends, attending masses and recruitment sessions, tithing ten percent of their income, avoiding wearing jeans, rejecting music and masturbation, and losing weight to fit Korean beauty standards. Former members alleged that members, including minors, were shamed for not meeting the church's rules and standards, and that members were ranked based on their recruitment rates. Church members were also reportedly shown graphic videos of Hell. In addition, pastors also arranged marriages between congregants.

=== Trespassing on college campuses ===
Some college campuses in the U.S. have banned the church's recruiters for trespassing or proselytizing without permission. The University of Memphis and Ole Miss barred the church's evangelism activities from their campuses. The church claims that this is due to rumours of trafficking on social media rather than the fact that they were unauthorized to be there. In New Zealand, the Otago University Students' Association in Dunedin disaffiliated from the Elohim World Academy following complaints from students about deceptive and coercive recruitment methods. The University of Otago's Proctor had considered trespassing members of the group but ruled it out since that would have violated the New Zealand Bill of Rights Act 1990's provisions on religious freedom and freedom of expression.

=== ASEZ volunteer division ===
The World Mission Society Church of God has a university volunteer division called the ASEZ ("Save the World from A to Z"). The organization, which recruits on university campuses, claims that students can be members of ASEZ without being members of the church, but this has been contested. According to the Yale Daily News, Yale students who were approached and attended meetings of the group stated that the organization was not framed as being separate from the church, and that representatives mainly focused on religious aspects rather than volunteerism. One student was told that the group's slogan was for "saving the people on earth from the end of the world." According to Steven Hassan, an author and counselor specializing in cults, many destructive cults use small "fringe groups" to deceptively recruit members, of which the ASEZ is an example.

=== False rumors of human trafficking ===
Since 2018, there have been rumors spread through social media that the evangelism about 'God the Mother' of the WMSCOG is linked to human trafficking. Local police investigations have confirmed that these rumors are false. A supervisor in the Vice-Criminal Intelligence Unit of the Fresno Police stated that there is no evidence of human trafficking activity and that research using government and non-government sources did not show any criminal activity associated with the individuals or the church elsewhere. The rumor is estimated to have started on social media in early 2018 and spread to various regions, particularly through campus student associations. Investigations into the rumor were conducted at the University of Mississippi, the University of Louisville, Vanderbilt University, the University of Georgia, the University of South Carolina, the University of Utah, Oberlin College, Texas State University, among others.

The church stated that due to false rumors, the church and its members experienced religious discrimination and harm. They reported that members had been threatened, faced murder threats, pepper spray attacks, and harassing phone calls. There was even an incident where someone almost ran over members with a vehicle. In response to the church's reports of these incidents, the police stationed patrol cars at the church. The church issued a statement requesting an end to false rumors and unfair harassment against its members.

==== Police verdict on incriminating activities ====
After investigating the church's evangelism activities, Oxford Police said that nothing incriminating has been reported and that sharing information door to door is allowed according to the Freedom of Religion Act. Fresno Police stated they could not find any reports of criminal behavior associated with them.

== Status as a cult ==
Former members and cult researchers have criticized the group, describing it as a cult that exercises excessive control over its members, enforces separation from family and friends, exploits its members excessively, and avoids transparency and accountability.

=== Lawsuit and accusations by Michele Colon ===
Michele Colon, a former member who attended WMSCOG in New Jersey for two years, claimed in her 2013 civil lawsuit against the church that the group is a profit-driven cult that uses psychological control tactics to prevent members from exposing its criminal and illegal behavior. In December 2015, In an interview with People magazine, Colon, whose claims were generally denied by the church but generally supported in interviews with six other former WMSCOG members, described WMSCOG as a "doomsday cult" and "opportunistic". She claimed that the group recruits people undergoing life transitions or feeling a void, exploiting this vulnerability to draw them in. She said that the church manipulates members with "fear and guilt" and constant repetition, and that it "micromanaged" her life, including controlling her music choices and forbidding internet use. She claimed that church leaders do not disclose until members are fully committed that their "God the Mother" is actually a living South Korean woman in her 70s, known by multiple names and various spiritual titles, who is reportedly the spiritual wife of the deceased founder, Ahn Sahng-hong. At least one former member has sued them for urging her to have an abortion, and others have accused the church of discouraging pregnancy in anticipation of the world ending in 2012.

Colon's lawsuit was dismissed, citing First Amendment grounds.

=== Hapimo press conference ===
In 2015, a former member held a press conference to present notarized confessions and declarations from members of the group Hapimo, which accused the Church. He claimed that the group members were not harmed by the Church. Instead, most members expected to gain personally by portraying the Church as a harmful cult and filing collective damage lawsuits. He also claimed that members were paid for solo protests in front of the Church and that protest workers were hired who were not actual victims. Additionally, he alleged that the group pressured members to stage fake divorces to depict the Church as a family-destroying cult. He also said that Kang, who seeks to overthrow the Church and become its leader, supported the group. Kang's website claims that the root of David is not Ahn Sahng-hong but the two witnesses, who, according to him, were born in 1974 and baptized in 1999. This interpretation aligns with Kang's own biography. After the former member's declarations, Hapimo sued him for defamation, but the court ruled that his claims about the group's activities were not proven false.

=== Cult specialists ===
Rick Alan Ross, cult specialist and deprogrammer describes the WMSCOG as "a very intense group… similar to the Unification Church [of] Sun Myung Moon—the Moonies", comparing WMSCOG indoctrination methods to those of the Unification Church. He states that the WMSCOG has driven members into bankruptcies due to excessive donations, and claims that some have lost their jobs to excessive demands by the group and associated sleep deprivation. Ross says that members often are sent to group housing and shared apartments, becoming isolated and alienated from family and friends, even spouses and adult children. Ross notes the group, which recruits members on university campuses, at malls and other shopping sites, has no meaningful accountability for leadership—a "dictatorship in Korea"—nor for the millions in revenue it receives.

Steven Hassan, an author and mental health counselor who specializes in cults, described the experiences of Yale students exposed to the group as matching those of what he calls "authoritarian" or "destructive" cults.

== In Korea and Vietnam ==
=== South Korea ===
The World Mission Society Church of God is one of many controversial and globalized grassroots Christian new religious movements that have emerged in South Korea and have experienced rapid growth over the past 20 years since the 2000s. (Note: Other groups include the Good News Mission(also known as Guwonpa) and the Shincheonji Church. These three groups each have distinct roots and doctrines and are not connected with one another.)

The Korean Christian community, including the National Council of Churches in Korea and the Christian Council of Korea, has "harshly criticized" the deification of Ahn Sahng-hong and Zahng Gil-jah. They have officially condemned the church as a blasphemous and heretical cult, opposed by various denominations.

==== Forced conversions ====
A heresy expert of the Christian Council of Korea was found guilty by the courts of attempting to forcibly convert members of the World Mission Society Church of God, thereby violating their human rights and religious freedom. Pastor Jin, vice chairman of the Christian Council of Korea's Countermeasure Committee against Heresy and an editor at 'Modern Religion', confined members of the church in attics or prayer rooms and conducted forced conversion sessions. Members who did not convert were forcibly admitted to psychiatric hospitals. The victims filed lawsuits against Pastor Jin and others involved in the confinement. In 2008, the court sentenced Pastor Jin to a suspended prison term for night-time group coercion and aiding confinement, acknowledging the serious violation of personal freedom and religious freedom under the guise of conversion persuasion. The accomplices and psychiatrists involved were also found guilty. Shin Hye-sook, director of the Women's Cultural Center, criticized the actions, stating that using violence against people of different religions indicates a lack of basic religious qualities. Religious groups also criticized the intolerance and judgment of different denominations as reminiscent of the medieval religious dark ages.

==== Opposition to construction ====
In the past, the World Mission Society Church of God rented parts of the collective buildings, but after 2007, church construction increased. As the number of buildings of the Church increased, Korean Christian organizations held protests and filed complaints to interfere with the church's construction. They stated, "The reason we must oppose the construction of this church on its own land with its own money is that this church is a cult." Most local governments approved the church's construction, and approximately 150 church buildings were constructed over the 10 years following 2007. However, a few local governments, including Yeosu City and Ulsan City, rejected the construction approvals, citing complaints and traffic congestion. The World Mission Society Church of God filed administrative lawsuits. The Korean courts ruled that "the collective petitions from religious organizations and nearby residents are merely personal and subjective evaluations of this church and cannot be seen as objective evidence that this religion causes harm. It is difficult to view this church as an anti-social religious group or to see its activities as anti-social. The church meets the legal parking requirements and there are no legal violations." Consequently, the courts declared the local governments' refusals to approve the church's construction to be illegal.

==== Wonju city government ====
In 2016, the Wonju city government denied construction approval for the Church of God in Wonju City, citing complaints and concerns regarding traffic congestion. However, there was controversy over the unfairness of the Wonju city government's refusal. The building applied for had about twice the number of legally required parking spaces, but the Wonju city government demanded parking spaces for 1,000 cars, assuming 1,000 church members. This calculation included children as drivers. Major South Korean media outlets reported suspicions of religious bias by the mayor of Wonju City regarding the rejection. Church members protested against the Wonju city government's administrative action by phone. There were more than 30,000 complaint calls made between 30 May and 1 June 2016. These complaints disrupted the city hall's complaint processing work. The church filed an administrative appeal against the Wonju city government's action, but the Administrative Appeals Commission dismissed it. The World Mission Society Church of God considered filing an administrative lawsuit against the Wonju city government.

Subsequently, in administrative lawsuits between the World Mission Society Church of God and other local governments, such as Yeosu City Hall and Ulsan City Hall, which had rejected construction approvals, the courts ruled that the local governments' refusals to approve the church's construction were illegal Although there was no administrative lawsuit against the Wonju city government, it changed its stance and in 2019 approved the use of the building for church purposes. They approved the previously rejected church construction, and the church held a dedication ceremony for the newly constructed church in 2023. When the World Mission Society Church of God applied to build an additional church in Taejang-dong, Wonju City, there were complaints filed again. However, the Wonju city government approved the construction application, stating there were no legal issues.

=== Vietnamese religious associations ===
In 2018, the Vietnamese Committee for Religious Affairs warned against the World Mission Society Church of God, describing it as cult-like. The government accused the group of deceptive recruitment, manipulative indoctrination, doomsday predictions, urging cash donations, and encouraging members to abandon their families. Authorities seized the Church's assets in Hanoi, Saigon, and other provinces, interrogated hundreds of members, and accused Church leaders of brainwashing and micromanaging members' lives.

Asia News reported that many consider these allegations to be false, used by Vietnamese security forces to discredit certain groups. Fr. Le Ngoc Thanh, a Redemptorist priest in Saigon, said he was afraid that the propaganda campaign against the World Mission Society Church of God was designed to create tensions between religious and non-religious people. Vietnam's independent media outlet, IJAVN reported that "the Ministry of Home Affairs recently requested local authorities to disband and revoke licenses for religious groups associated with the 'Church of God' and 'Heavenly Mother' focus, preventing these organizations from regrouping and forming new centers of activity. This is difficult to understand because, even without any discovered violations of the law, licenses are still being revoked".

== Inconsistencies ==
=== Change in Ahn Sahng-hong's book ===
The 1980 edition of The Mystery of God and the Spring of the Water of Life has 38 chapters in total. In a 2007 edition, three chapters were removed: Chapter 1: Restoration of Jerusalem and the Prophecy of 40 Years, Chapter 11: Let Us Reveal the Truth from the History Books About the Church, and Chapter 36: Elijah Will Be Sent.

The "New Covenant Passover Church of God" (NCPCOG), which is the group that has split with the WMSCOG, claimed that the WMSCOG had changed the first edition dates of "The Mystery of God and the Spring of the Water of Life".

== Membership and size ==
Baptism is a requirement for becoming a member of the church. In 2024, according to major media outlets in South Korea, the church announced that it has 3.7 million members in 175 countries worldwide. Regarding worship attendance, in 2001, when the church had about 400,000 members, it reported that approximately 120,000 of them participated in worship services. (Note: Many Christian denominations also require baptism as a condition for membership, In America, statistics suggest that approximately 20-40% of church members attend worship services monthly.) In South Korea, opposing Christian denominations estimated the number of believers in the church to be around 100,000 in 2013 and between 200,000 and 300,000 in 2017. They identify this church as the largest organization among the Christian new religious movements in Korea.

== Awards ==
UK ZION, a World Mission Society Church of God chapter, was awarded The Queen's Award for Voluntary Service in 2016.
