= Zahng Gil-jah =

- Born: 29 October 1943 (age 83)
- Occupation: Chairperson
- Years active: since 1984
- Known for: "God the Mother" in the World Mission Society Church of God (WMSCOG)

Korean name
- Hangul: 장길자
- Hanja: 張吉子
- RR: Jang Gilja
- MR: Chang Kilcha
- IPA: [tɕaŋɡiɭtɕ͈a]
- Website: Zahng Gil-jah

Zahng Gil-jah (Korean: 장길자; also romanized as Chang Gil-jah) is a leader in the World Mission Society Church of God. They refer to her as God the Mother or Heavenly Mother. She is also the honorary chairperson of the International WeLoveU Foundation, a social welfare organization.

== Religious activity ==
The World Mission Society Church of God, a Korean new religious movement, teaches that Zahng and Ahn Sahng-hong (1918–1985), a South Korean Christian minister regarded by his followers as Christ, are to be jointly regarded as God. Church members may call her "God the Mother", "Mother Jerusalem", "New Jerusalem Mother", "Heavenly Mother", or simply "Mother". Her followers believe she has fulfilled all prophecies of the Bible.

In 1985, following the sudden death of Ahn Sahng-Hong, eleven out of the thirteen churches of the Church of God agreed to recognize both Ahn and Zahng as God. The two congregations that refused became the New Covenant Passover Church of God. Despite her status in her church, Zahng's media outlets—such as her YouTube page—tend not to reference the claim in their content. Instead, they focus on her activities as chairwoman of her foundation.

The Korean Christian community has generally agreed that the teachings of Ahn and Zahng go against Christian beliefs. Members of the Witnesses of Ahn Sahng-Hong have been known to visit college campuses in the U.S., often without permission, and approach students with their teachings about Zahng being "God the Mother". The "South Korea-Based World Mission Society Church of God" is sometimes labeled a religious cult.

== Social activities ==
In addition to her status in the World Mission Society Church of God, Zahng is the chairperson of the International WeLoveU Foundation, which changed its name from New Life Welfare Foundation in 2007.

In spite of her involvement with the Ahn Sahng-Hong movement, Zahng has met with high-ranking political leaders, including former Gabonese president Ali Bongo and U.S. Senator Richard Blumenthal.

== See also ==
- God the Father
- Mother goddess
