= Cynthia Turner =

Maltese pianist (1932–2021)

- Born: 1932; Valletta, Crown Colony of Malta
- Died: 1 February 2021 (aged 88); Mater Dei Hospital, Msida, Malta
- Occupation: pianist

Cynthia Caruana Turner (1932 – 1 February 2021) was a Maltese pianist. She was Malta's best known pianist and one of its most celebrated musicians.

== Career ==
At age 15, Turner received a scholarship to the Royal Academy of Music in London. She continued her studies in Germany and Italy, and under French composer and pianist Francis Poulenc. Poulenc dedicated his 1949 Piano Concerto to Turner in December 1952.

She played Poulenc's Piano Concerto for Queen Elizabeth during a royal performance at the Manoel Theatre on 15 November 1967. She performed on stages, cable radio, radio and television in Malta, Italy, France, Germany and Egypt.

In 1987 when the National Council of Women of Malta established the Bice Mizzi Vassallo Music Competition; Turner was a member of the organising committee and chaired the adjudicating panel for all editions of the contest. She was also a board member of the Malta Philharmonic Orchestra and, in the early 2000s, a vice president of YWCA Malta.

== Honours and recognition ==
She became a member of the National Order of Merit in 2004, one of the Maltese state's highest honours. She also was made a chevalier dans L'Order des Palmes Académiques and an associate of the Royal Academy of Music in London.

In 2017, the executive board of YWCA Malta nominated Turner for the Gieħ Ir-Repubblika award.

== Personal life and death ==
Turner was born in Valletta in 1932. She grew up in Sliema. She went to the Convent of the Sacred Heart school. She was married to Anthony Caruana, with whom she had two sons. At the time of her death, she had five grandchildren.

Turner contracted COVID-19 during the COVID-19 pandemic in Malta while receiving treatment for a hip and wrist fracture. She died on 1 February 2021, at age 88.
