= Richard Nutt =

Australian cricketer

Personal information
- Born: 25 June 1911; Sydney, Australia
- Died: 5 February 1985 (aged 73); Sydney, Australia
- Source: ESPNcricinfo, 11 January 2017

Richard Nutt (25 June 1911 – 5 February 1985) was an Australian cricketer. He played six first-class matches for New South Wales between 1931/32 and 1932/33.

== See also ==
- List of New South Wales representative cricketers
