= Bice Mizzi =

Maltese pianist

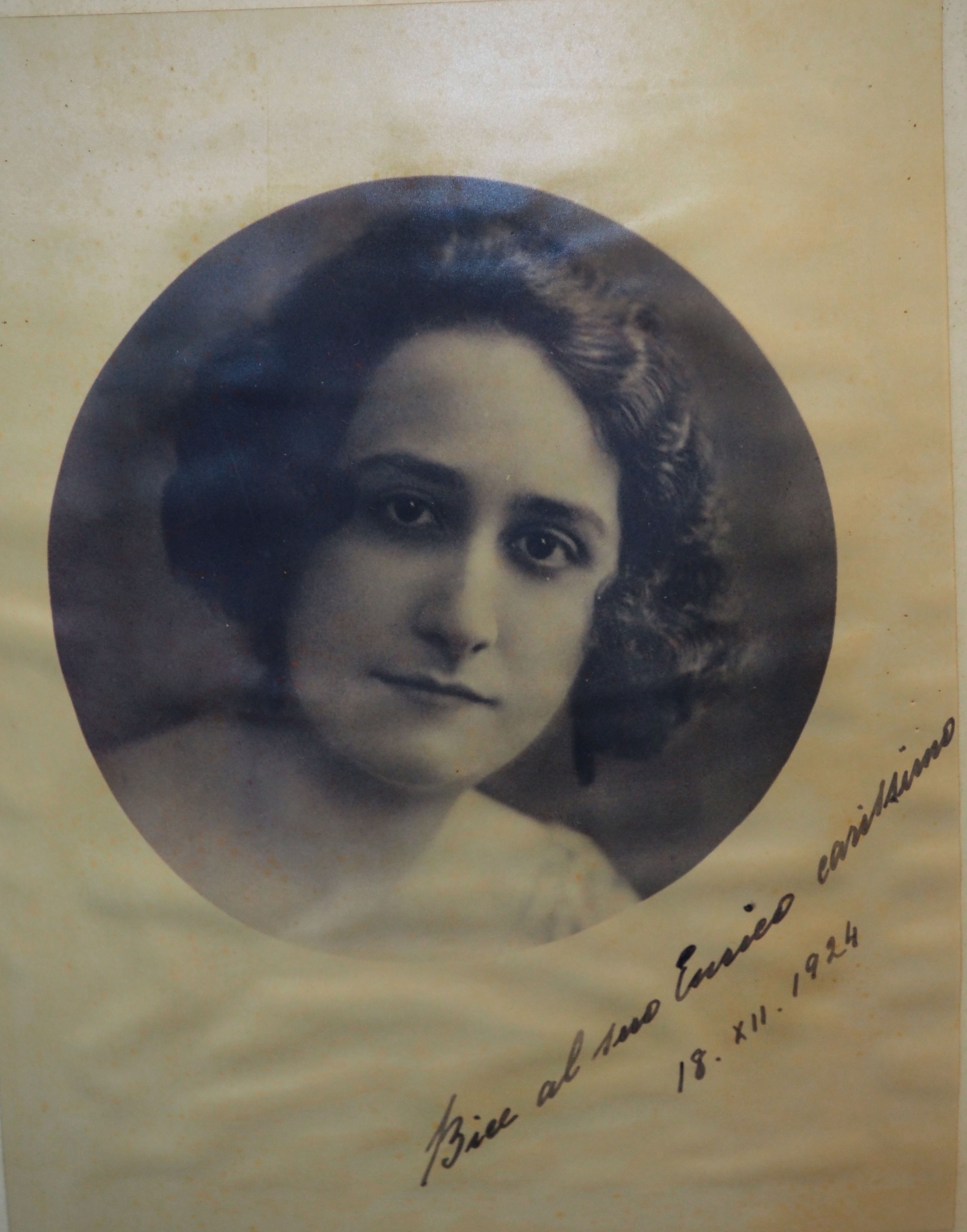
Bice Vassallo portrait with hand written message "Bice al suo Enrico carissimo 18.XII.1924"

Bice Mizzi Vassallo (born Beatrix Vassallo, also known as Bice Vassallo and Bice Mizzi; 11 November 1899 – 22 February 1985) was a Maltese pianist, considered among the foremost pianists of her generation. She is also known as the daughter of composer Paolino Vassallo and Maria Anna nee Grech, and the wife of former Maltese Prime Minister Enrico Mizzi.

== Early life and education ==
Bice Vassallo studied under father, the Maltese composer Paolino Vassallo, a constant driving force in her early musical career. Under his direction, she studied the piano and violin.

Bice was awarded a distinction in both her examinations in Pianoforte (lower and higher division) from the Associated Board of the Royal Academy of Music and The Royal College of Music in 1908 and 1909 respectively.

== Performances ==
In May 1909, Mizzi performed a classical music recital at the Manoel Theatre. This performance took place under the patronage of the Bishop of Malta Pietro Pace and it was organised in aid of the Sisters of St. Joseph, Sliema. Various newspapers published reviews of this performance: "Pjanista ta'dauc il ftit snin u ta' dic il ħila hecc cbira ftit haun f'id-dinja u għalhekk għandna biex niftaħru u biex nifirħu" (A pianist so young and of such great skill there are few in this world and that is why we should be proud and happy). "Bice è un piccolo Mozart" (Bice is a little Mozart).

She also performed a concert in aid of the Valletta Society of St. Vincent de Paul. This vocal and instrumental concert took place on Sunday 1 May 1910 at the Cinematograph Theatre in Cospicua.

The next year, at the age of 11, she performed in the 'Scarlatti Hall' at the Conservatorio di Musica Vincenzo Bellini in Palermo. This concert was under the patronage of H.E. the Princess of Castelreale. A critic from Milan’s Rassegna Melodrammatica wrote the following after Bice's performance: “A concert has been held in the Scarlatti Hall of the Royal Conservatorio of Music in Palermo, in which the protagonist was 11-year old Bice Vassallo of Malta. She has been described as a true prodigy of the piano. The distinguished if diffident audience gave her full honours of a complete triumph”.

In 1912 she performed at the Royal Opera House in Valletta. In 1923, the same year her father died, she performed a recital at Wigmore Hall in London.

On 18 October 1946 she performed at a concert by Maltese composer Carmelo Pace conducted by Francesco Bellizzi at the British Institute in Valletta. She also performed in 1952 at the University Hall at the Phoenicia Hotel in Floriana.

== Life and family ==
On 26 June 1926, Bice Vassallo married Enrico Mizzi, the then leader of the Nationalist party. Her husband went on to become Prime Minister of Malta in 1950 shortly before dying just a few months after.

The next year, Bice and Mizzi had a son and named him Fortunato, after Enrico’s father, Fortunato Mizzi.

=== Life during the war ===
Bice and her son passed through trying times during their life because of their familial association with Enrico Mizzi. In 1940, Enrico was arrested for allegedly having Italian sympathies, and interned at Fort Salvatore in Kordin. He was then transferred to St. Agatha’s Convent in Rabat. In a letter dated 19 June 1940, Bice wonders why her husband hasn't received all her letters, since she has written to him nearly every day "Mi meraviglio come mai non ricevi le mie lettere perchè fin’ora ho scritto sempre quasi ogni giorno".

There was a time when Bice and her son would be walking through the streets in Rabat, when visiting Enrico, while being hurled with verbal insults and pelted with potato peels and eggshells. In February 1942, the then Governor of Malta, Sir William Dobbie, took out a warrant to deport Enrico Mizzi, together with another 47 Maltese nationals, to Uganda. It wasn’t until 1945 that finally the group of exiles was allowed back into the country. Her husband quickly re-entered politics and was elected as prime minister at the 1950 elections which took place on 2–4 September. This success was short-lived, since he died less than 4 months later on the 20 December 1950 at the age of 65. He was given a state funeral and to this date, he is the only prime minister to have died in office.

=== Later years ===
Mizzi devoted herself to teaching in later years and used the practice as of income after the death of her husband in 1950. Upon her husband's death, she faced difficulties accessing her husband’s government pension.

A school friend of her son Fortunat, Joe Felice Pace, described Bice as a woman of steel with a heart of gold, who dedicated her life entirely to her family, dedicating herself to their endeavours completely, putting aside her career doing so. Pace also recalled an instance when she was invited to give a number of concerts abroad in the late 1960s. After dwelling on this for quite a long time, she finally declined the invitation because she felt she could not leave her son alone for a fortnight, since she was worried that this would interfere with his mission. He also recalled that her days consisted of giving piano lessons in the morning and then would play for her own pleasure between noon and 12:30pm, most notably Chopin. She would then stop for lunch and was joined in the kitchen by him and her son Fortunat and resume her lessons in the afternoon.

=== Death and legacy ===
Bice Mizzi Vassallo died on the 22 February 1985 at the age of 85.

In 1987, the National Council of Women of Malta instituted the Bice Mizzi Vassallo Music Competition in her honour; Cynthia Turner chaired the adjudicating panel until her death in 2021. The competition takes place every 2 years and has run uninterruptedly ever since it was established.

The Bice Mizzi Vassallo Primary state school in Pembroke, as well as streets in the same locality and the town of Santa Luċija, are named after her.
