= Bhawani Prasad Mishra =

Hindi poet (1913–1985)

Bhawani Mishra Prasad
- Born: 29 March 1913; Tigaria, Central Provinces and Berar, British India
- Died: 20 February 1985 (aged 71); Narsinghpur, Madhya Pradesh, India
- Occupations: poet and author

Bhawani Prasad Mishra (29 March 1913 – 20 February 1985) was a poet and author from India. He was honoured with Sahitya Akademi Award in 1972 for his book Buni Hui Rassi.

== Personal life ==
Bhawani Prasad Mishra was born on 29 March 1913 in the village Tigaria of Hoshangabad district in erstwhile Central Province of British India. He spent many years of his life in Delhi. He and his spouse, Sarla Mishra, had 2 children: Anupam Mishra and Namita Sharma, who played an important role in his life and work. Mishra died on 20 February 1985 among his family at Narsinghpur town of Madhya Pradesh where he had gone to attend a marriage function.

== Works ==
Mishra's work spans genres such as poetry, essays, memoirs, children's literature, and translations. However, he was most well known for his poetry. His poetry was known for its profound emotional depth but for having a simple language that could be accessible to the common masses. It often dwelled on themes of everyday life. Buni Hui Rassi, Geetfarosh, Satpuda Ke Ghane Jungle, Sannata, and Khushboo Ke Shilalekh are some of his most famous poems. Other notable works of Bhavani Prasad Mishra include:

- Ye kohare mere haainn
- Trikaal sandhyaaah
- Tus ki aag
- Kuchh neeti kuchh rajneethtti
- Idaṃ na mam
- Kathputli kavita
- Pahila pain (poem)
- Ghar ki yaad (poem)
- Man ek maili kameez hai
- Trikal sandhya
- Ise jagavo (poem)

== Beliefs ==
Mishra was a Gandhian and was deeply disturbed by the effects of colonization in India. He worried that the English education system in India was a hidden poison. Mishra published as many as 500 poems espousing Gandhi's values.
