= Cliff Coulson =

Australian rules footballer, born 1906

Personal information
- Full name: Cliff Coulson
- Born: 28 July 1906
- Died: 28 February 1985 (aged 78)
- Original team: Frankston
- Height: 189 cm (6 ft 2 in)
- Weight: 80 kg (176 lb)

Playing career^{1}
Years	Club	Games (Goals)
1931	Essendon	1 (1)
- ^{1} Playing statistics correct to the end of 1931.

Cliff Coulson (28 July 1906 – 28 February 1985) was an Australian rules footballer who played with Essendon in the Victorian Football League (VFL).
