= Ike Robinson =

English footballer

Personal information
- Full name: Isaac Robinson
- Date of birth: 16 July 1915
- Place of birth: Bishop Auckland, England
- Date of death: 1979 (aged 63–64)
- Height: 5 ft 11 in (1.80 m)
- Position: Full-back

Senior career*
Years	Team	Apps	(Gls)
1933–1934	Brotherton Colliery Welfare		
1934–1935	Leeds United	0	(0)
1935–1936	Scarborough		
1936–1939	Grimsby Town	3	(0)
1939	Boston United		
- * Club domestic league appearances and goals

Isaac "Ike" Robinson (16 July 1915 – 1979) was an English professional footballer who played as a full-back.
