= Davidic dynasty in Bible prophecy =

In Bible prophecy, several verses relate to the future of the Davidic line. Christians argue that Jesus fulfills these prophecies, while skeptics and Jews disagree.

== The prophecies ==
=== David's line ===
After Zedekiah, the last king of Judah was forced out by Nebuchadnezzar in the siege of Jerusalem (Jeremiah 32:4–5), the LORD says: 'David will never fail to have a man to sit on the throne of the house of Israel...' (Jeremiah 33:17). Jehoiachin was placed in a position of authority during Babylonian exile at the end of 2 Kings. He was called king under exile in several Babylonian food-rationing lists.

=== Jehoiakim and Jeconiah ===
Jeremiah prophesied that Jehoiakim will have no one to sit on the throne of David (Jeremiah 36:30). His son Jehoiachin succeeded him as king for three months and ten days before Nebuchadnezzar forced him out, ending the reign of Jehoiakim's descendants (2 Chronicles 36:8–9; 2 Kings 24:8). After Jehoiachin spent 37 years in prison, Nebuchadnezzar's successor Evil-merodach released the imprisoned king Jehoiachin and elevated him above all other captive kings that were in Babylon (2 Kings 25:27). Jehoiakim is the ancestor of Jesus' step/adoptive father Joseph according to Matthew 1:11 (skipped in list; see 1 Chronicles 3:15–16 and 2 Kings 24:8).

In Jeremiah 22:30, God states that neither Jehoiachin (also called Jeconiah) or his offspring will prosper, for none of his offspring will sit on throne of David and rule over Judah.

Jehoiachin's offspring did not sit on the throne of David or rule over Judah. 2 Kings 25:27 records that Jehoiachin was a prisoner for thirty seven years. For two years, Evil-merodach king of Babylon gave Jehoiachin a seat of honor higher than those of the other kings who were with him in Babylon and gave him a regular daily allowance all the days of his life (2 Kings 25:27–30). His family retained leadership of the Babylonian exiles (Ezekiel 1:2), and his descendants were at the head of those who returned to Zion. He is the ancestor of Jesus' step/adoptive father Joseph according to Matthew 1:12.

=== Solomon's line ===
God states that the house, throne and kingdom of David and his offspring (in the verse called "the one who will build a house for my Name") will last forever (see 2 Samuel 7:12–16, 2 Chronicles 13:5, Psalm 89:20–37).

However, 1 Kings 9:4–7 as well as 1 Chronicles 28:5 and 2 Chronicles 7:17 state that Solomon's establishment is conditional on Solomon obeying God's commandments. Solomon built the temple in Jerusalem (see 2 Chronicles 6:7–10, 2 Chronicles 2:1), but did not obey God's commandments (see 1 Kings 11:1–14).

The destruction of the Kingdom of Judah by Nebuchadnezzar in 586 BCE brought an end to the rule of the royal house of David.

== Debate ==
Some scholars state that God has promised an eternal dynasty to David unconditionally (1 Kings 11:36, 15:4, 2 Kings 8:19). They argue that the conditional promise of 1 Kings 9:4–7 seems to undercut this unconditional covenant. Most interpreters have taken the expression "throne of Israel" as a reference to the throne of the United Monarchy. They see this as a conditionalization of the unconditional dynastic promise to David's house expressed in 1 Kings 11:36, 15:4 and 2 Kings 8:19. They argue the presence of both unconditional and conditional promises to the house of David would create intense theological dissonance in the Book of Kings.

Christians believe that the promise is for the coming one who would fulfill the role of king and priest, which they state Jesus did, rather than a permanent earthly kingship.

God did not promise an unbroken monarchy but one of David's descendants who would be qualified to sit on that throne when it was reestablished. For Jeremiah 33:14 states 14 "Look, the days are coming" -- this is the LORD's declaration -- "when I will fulfill the good promise that I have spoken concerning the house of Israel and the house of Judah." and in the context of "those days" coming in the future, then says 17 "For this is what the LORD says: David will never fail to have a man sitting on the throne of the house of Israel." and 18 "The Levitical priests will never fail to have a man always before me to offer burnt offerings, to burn grain offerings, and to make sacrifices." So the context in the text clearly states this promise being for the future “coming” Davidic fulfillment, not for an unbroken line of descendants and in the typical Old Testament prophets language of hyperbole, Jesus fulfilled the King and Priest role as a priest according to the line of Melchizedek in Gen 14:18 “ Melchizedek, king of Salem, brought out bread and wine; he was a priest to God Most High.” David’s earthly line failed before the righteous Branch came, hence Jeremiahs future prophesy. (cf. Luke 1:31–33). The genealogies of Matthew and Luke show that this promise was fulfilled as Christ was able to trace both His legal line through Joseph and His physical line through Mary back to David (Matthew 1:1–16; Luke 3:23–31).

Christians believe that Matthew and Luke present two different genealogies. They point out that some names are common to both, but many names are different. Matthew begins at the patriarch Abraham and works his way to Jesus the Christ, while Luke begins at Jesus and works his way back to Adam. They argue Matthew presents the genealogy of Joseph, and Luke presents the genealogy of Mary. In Luke's days they argue, it was proper and correct to cite Joseph's name in Mary's genealogy. Christians argue that Joseph adopted Jesus as his legal son and thus Jesus became both David's direct descendant through David's son Nathan (Luke's genealogy) and David's legal royal heir through Solomon (Matthew's genealogy). Critics claim this is just a required reinterpretation of the prophecy. In rabbinic thinking, the reestablishment of the Davidic kingdom was tied to the Messiah, who was to be a descendant of King David. He would redeem the Jews from exile and reestablish their independence in the land of Israel. Jews argue this is not fulfilled in Jesus.

If he was adopted, they argue, based on a distinction between full-blooded Jews and half-blooded Jews in the scripture,(Numbers 1:18–44, 34:14; Leviticus 24:10) under Jewish law certain family and tribal affiliations must be through the birth father and cannot be claimed by adoption. Moreover, Jews argue that the Messiah must descend through David's son Solomon (2 Sam 7:12–16, Psalm 89:28–38, 1 Chronicles 17:11–14, 22:9–10, 28:6–7). Luke's genealogy of Joseph is traced back to David through his son Nathan (who was not a king). They argue this eliminates Jesus' genealogy in Luke. In addition, to presume that Mary was of Davidic descent in Luke presents the problem that Mary could not pass on what she did not possess: (1) Maternal connection does not enter into consideration for succession to the throne of David which is passed on only through a continuous male line: "There shall not be cut off from David a man to sit upon the throne of the house of Israel" (Jeremiah 33:17); (2) Biblically, the right of lineal privilege, that is, kingship and priesthood, are exclusively passed on through the male line.

Christians respond that a virgin birth avoids what they claim is a physical but not legal curse of Jehoiakim (while a reversal of the curse may have even occurred; and even if no reversal occurred, an adoption by a descendant of King Solomon gives Jesus legal inheritance rights to that kingdom—thus, again, protecting him from the physical curse. Christians also argue that the names Zerubbabel and Shealtiel in the two lineages have different parents and children and therefore are just common names that do not refer to the same people.

Jews respond that the virgin birth is substantiated by a misused excerpt of Isaiah (see Isaiah 7:14). Accordingly, Jewish scholars never considered Isaiah 7:14 as a messianic prophecy.

== See also ==
- Genealogy of Jesus
- Jesus and Messianic prophecy
