= Alex Lockie =

English footballer (1915–1974)

Personal information
- Full name: Alexander James Lockie
- Date of birth: 11 April 1915
- Place of birth: South Shields, England
- Date of death: 1974 (aged 58–59)
- Position: Defender

Senior career*
Years	Team	Apps	(Gls)
1933–1934	South Shields St Andrew's		
1934–1935	Reyrolles		
1935–1946	Sunderland	40	(1)
1946–1947	Notts County	23	(0)
- * Club domestic league appearances and goals

Alexander James Lockie (11 April 1915 – 1974) was an English professional footballer who played as a defender for Sunderland.
