= Norman Beeston =

Australian cricketer

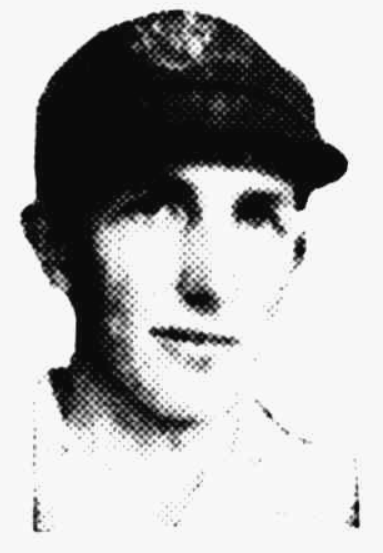

Personal information
- Born: 29 September 1900; Brisbane, Queensland, Australia
- Died: 4 February 1985 (aged 84); Brisbane, Queensland, Australia
- Source: Cricinfo, 1 October 2020

Norman Beeston (29 September 1900 – 4 February 1985) was an Australian cricketer. He played in seven first-class matches for Queensland between 1924 and 1928.

== Cricket career ==
Beeston played for South Brisbane in Brisbane Grade Cricket and was receiving praise for his batting in the press in January 1923. He was selected in a trial cricket match to select the Queensland state team in November 1923, and in November 1924 some expressed frustration that Beeston had not been selected to represent the Queensland state side.

== See also ==
- List of Queensland first-class cricketers
