= Ken Levey =

Australian rules footballer

Personal information
- Full name: Kenneth Emery Levey
- Born: 4 May 1923
- Died: 18 February 1985 (aged 61)
- Original team: Melbourne Grammar
- Height: 178 cm (5 ft 10 in)
- Weight: 71 kg (157 lb)

Playing career^{1}
Years	Club	Games (Goals)
1943–44	Melbourne	17 (0)
- ^{1} Playing statistics correct to the end of 1944.

Kenneth Emery Levey (4 May 1923 – 18 February 1985) was an Australian rules footballer who played with Melbourne in the Victorian Football League (VFL).
