= Reber Simpkins Cann =

Reber Simpkins Cann (July 26, 1903 – February 5, 1985) was an American educator, social worker and community activist.

== Early life and education ==
Reber Simpkins was born in Woodsworth, Louisiana in Rapides Parish. Her mother was Bijou Turner and her father was Reverend James A. Simpkins. Her two younger siblings were Ruth Simpkins and William T. Simpkins.

Simpkins completed her primary and secondary education in Shreveport, Louisiana. She graduated from Central High School, and went on to study at Wiley College in Marshall, Texas. After one year, Simpkins transferred to Wilberforce University, where she earned a bachelor of arts degree. She later pursued additional study at the University of Cincinnati in Ohio.

== Career ==
Simpkins Cann began her career as a teacher at the same elementary school she attended in Shreveport, Louisiana. After one year of teaching, she moved to Cincinnati and worked at the Shoemaker Clinic, a health clinic that served African Americans who could not afford to pay, at no or low cost. Social services were also provided in the same building. She later worked as a social worker at the Transient Service Bureau, a program whose aim was to provide relief for unemployed residents. After fourteen years of service she became a supervisor in the Welfare Department.

Simpkins Cann provided numerous detailed minutes, agendas, reports and correspondence through her service on an array of social justice organizations. Simpkins Cann participated in initiatives to improve employment opportunities, access and quality of life for black communities in Cincinnati, Ohio and on a national level. Her advocacy efforts included participation in the NAACP, the National Urban League, the National Council of Negro Women, the Council of Social Agencies, the Cincinnati Council on World Affairs and the Cincinnati Department of Urban Development, among others. Community-led initiatives by these organizations used reports and assessments in order to document the gaps in accessibility to healthcare and recreational services for children and families; took inventories of community services and needs; and created involvement in community planning to keep track of the allocation of resources. The Reber Simpkins Cann papers contain these documents and are held at the Amistad Research Center.

Simpkins Cann was one of the first black women elected to the Cincinnati Woman's City Club, Simpkins Cann was also named the first woman of the year honoree of Zeta Phi Beta sorority. An active member of Allen Temple Church, she served on its trustee board for twenty-five years, was the chairperson of the budget and finance committee, and was a member of the church's Artist Guild and Fellowship Council. Simpkins Cann was one of the first Black women on the Cincinnati Council of Church Women. Initiated into Delta Sigma Theta sorority in 1922, she served as chair of the Cincinnati chapter of the organization, national secretary from 1944 to 1952, and national vice president from 1952 to 1954. She was a charter member of the Cincinnati chapter of Links Incorporated and the Cincinnati Urban League. Simpkins Cann also served as president of the Cincinnati chapter of the National Council of Negro Women.

== Personal life and legacy ==
Reber Simpkins met Braxton Cann at Wilberforce University, where they were both enrolled. They married on July 9, 1924, and had five children, four daughters and one son: Reber Consuelo Williams, Gwen Cann, Johnnie Mae Durant, Ruth S. Hicks and Braxton Francourt Cann Jr. Reber Simpkins Cann died on February 5, 1985, in Cincinnati, Ohio.
