= Philip Snow (cricketer, born 1907) =

English cricketer

Personal information
- Full name: Philip Sidney Snow
- Born: 2 July 1907; Kendal, Westmorland, England
- Died: 13 February 1985 (aged 77); Reading, Berkshire, England
- Batting: Right-handed
- Bowling: Right-arm medium Right-arm off break

Domestic team information
- Years: Team
- 1928–1929: Oxford University

Career statistics
Competition	First-class
Matches	2
Runs scored	41
Batting average	10.25
100s/50s	–/–
Top score	22
Balls bowled	288
Wickets	5
Bowling average	23.80
5 wickets in innings	–
10 wickets in match	–
Best bowling	2/31
Catches/stumpings	1/–
- Source: Cricinfo, 10 March 2020

Philip Sidney Snow (2 July 1907 – 13 February 1985) was an English first-class cricketer.

Snow was born at Kendal in July 1907. He was educated at Shrewsbury School, before going up to Brasenose College, Oxford. While studying at Oxford, he made two appearances in first-class cricket for Oxford University against Lancashire in 1928, and Nottinghamshire in 1929. He scored 44 runs in his two appearances, with a high score of 22. A bowler who bowled a combination of right-arm medium pace and off break, he took 5 wickets with best figures of 2 for 31. Snow died at Reading in February 1985.
