= Ahn Sahng-hong =

Korean religious leader (1918–1985)

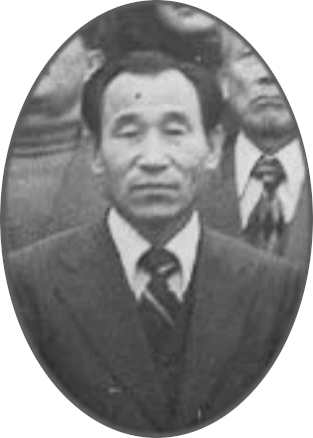
- Ahn Sahng-hong in 1974
- Born: Ahn Sahng-hong; 13 January 1918; Myeongdeok-ri (명덕리), Gyenam-myeon, Jangsu County, North Jeolla Province, Japanese Korea
- Died: 25 February 1985 (aged 67); Maryknoll Hospital, Busan, South Korea
- Resting place: Seokgye Cemetery, Oeseok-ri (신전리), Sangbuk-myeon, Yangsan, South Gyeongsang Province, South Korea; 35°27′26″N 129°2′55″E
- Occupations: Religious leader, author
- Years active: 1948 – 1985
- Known for: World Mission Society Church of God
- Notable work: The Mystery of God and The Spring of The Water of Life
- Spouse: Hwang Won-sun (1923–2008) (married 1958–1985, his death)
- Children: Ahn Kwang-sup (b. 1954); Ahn Myeong-seon (b. 1957); Ahn Chang-jun (b. 1959)
- Parent(s): Ahn Gyujung and Lee Weoljeon

Korean name
- Hangul: 안상홍
- Hanja: 安商洪
- RR: An Sanghong
- MR: An Sanghong

Ahn Sahng-hong (Note: Also variously represented in Latin letters as Ahn Sahng Hong, Ahn Sahng-hong, Ahn Sahnghong, Ahnsahnghong, Ahn Sang Hong, Ahn Sang-hong, Ahn Sanghong, Ahn Sahng-hong, An Sahng Hong, An Sahng-hong, An Sahnghong, Ansahnghong, An Sang Hong, An Sang-hong, An Sanghong, and Ansanghong. Korean names follow the <family name> <given name> pattern, but his name is sometimes romanizised using the Western pattern <given name> <family name>, consequently e.g. Sang Hong Ahn, Sang Hong An etc. can also occur.) (Korean: 안상홍; Hanja: 安商洪; 13 January 1918 – 25 February 1985) was a South Korean religious leader and founder of the Church of God Jesus Witnesses. In 1948, after receiving baptism from a Seventh-day Adventist minister, he began to call for the restoration of the truth of the New Covenant and the last religious reformation. In 1964 he established the Church of God in Busan. During his life, Ahn had thirteen churches in Korea. After Ahn Sahng-hong's death, the church declared him as the Second Coming Christ.

== Early life ==
He was born on 13 January 1918 in the small, rural village of Myeongdeok-ri in the North Jeolla Province at a time when Korea was under Japanese rule. From 1937, during the Second Sino-Japanese War and World War II, Ahn and his mother lived in Japan over a nine-year period. He returned to Korea in 1946. The family migrated to Busan, the city in which he would later found his church.

== Establishment of his own church ==
Ahn began attending the local congregation of the Seventh-day Adventist Church in 1947 and received baptism in 1948. He became critical of the teachings in the Seventh-day Adventist Church, and the church disfellowshipped him in March 1962. Twenty-three people followed him and left the church. Two years later, on 28 April 1964, he established his church named the 'Church of God' in Haeundae District of Busan. He cites the First Epistle to the Corinthians and the First Epistle to Timothy as the sources for the name 'Church of God.' (Note: The name 'Church of God', mentioned several times in e.g. Paul the Apostle's First and Second Epistle to the Corinthians, and in his Epistle to the Galatians, is a name used by numerous, mostly unrelated Christian denominational bodies.) On 15 April 1984, the last Passover ceremony was held in Gangdong District, Seoul. On 10 January 1985, the last Provisional General Assembly took place in Seoul. Church of God expanded to 13 congregations in South Korea before Ahn's death in 1985.

== Beliefs ==
He published his claims in more than two dozen books. His teachings are compiled in his representative book, 'The Mystery of God and the Spring of the Water of Life', published in 1980.

=== The Restoration of the Truth of the Early Church ===
Ahn claimed the restoration of the New Covenant of the Early Church, insisting that the truth of the Apostolic early church had been distorted.

- The Old Covenant feasts of Leviticus 23, such as the Passover, the Feast of Unleavened Bread, the day of First Fruits, Pentecost, the Feast of Trumpets, the Day of Atonement, and the Feast of Tabernacles, were changed into New Covenant feasts through Christ's sacrifice on the cross. In order to receive salvation, one must keep God's laws, including the seven feasts in three times of the New Covenant.
- The New Covenant Passover has blessings such as eternal life, forgiveness of sins, and protection from disasters.
- The Sabbath must be kept on Saturday, not Sunday.
- Christmas is a pagan religious celebration that originated from the birthday of various sun gods such as Tammuz, Mithra, and Sol Invictus; not the birthday of Jesus.
- The cross is considered a form of idolatry.
- Women must wear a veil on their heads during worship and prayer.

=== The Second Coming of Christ ===
Ahn wrote various interpretations of Bible prophecies about the second coming of Jesus, in his book 'The Mystery of God and the Spring of the Water of Life.'

- The Bible sealed after the apostolic era will be revealed by the Second Coming Christ.
- The Second Coming Christ will appear in the flesh, and fulfill the mission of Elijah, the parable of the fig tree, the prophecy of King David, and the prophecy of Melchizedek. He will restore Zion, where the feasts of the New Covenant are kept.
- The Father, the Son, and the Holy Spirit are one and the same Holy Spirit.
- The 6-day creation work is a prophecy of the 6,000-year salvation work. At the end of the 6,000 years, the Holy Spirit and the Bride will appear and give the water of life.

=== Soul ===
Ahn says that human souls are angels who sinned in Heaven and were cast out, and that the New Covenant Passover is the way to receive the forgiveness of sins through the blood of Jesus Christ and to return to Heaven.

== Death ==
He collapsed from a cerebral hemorrhage after lunch on 24 February 1985, and died the following day, 25 February, at the Maryknoll Hospital, at the age of 67. (Note: Korean: 메리놀병원。Also romanizised Merinol Hospital after its pronunciation,) He was buried at Seokgye Cemetery, located 30 kilometres (19 mi) away from Busan. (Note: Korean: 석계공원묘지; seok-kkye-gong-won-myo-ji)

Ahn Sang-hong's followers believe that his death fulfilled a biblical prophecy regarding King David. The basis for this is Ahn Sahng-hong's interpretation of the Bible prophecy related to King David and an interview article published in a weekly religious newspaper on 18 March 1981.

Ahn Sahng-hong claimed that King David is a prophecy about Jesus Christ, the spiritual King David. and that David's reign of 40 years after being anointed at the age of 30 is a prophecy that Christ would receive baptism, a spiritual anointing at the age of 30 and carry out the ministry of salvation for 40 years. He said that since Jesus preached the gospel for 3 years and ascended, he must appear in flesh again to fulfill the remaining 37 years of the 40-year reign on the throne of David and then die.

He died in 1985, 37 years after he was baptized at the age of 30 in 1948. Therefore, his followers claim that he prophesied his own death during an interview with a weekly religious newspaper in 1981 and they believe that his death fulfilled the prophecy of King David.

== Succession ==
The unexpected death of Ahn gave rise to a power struggle within Church of God: After Ahn Sahng-hong's death on February 25, 1985, an extraordinary general assembly was held in Busan on March 4, including Ahn Sahng-hong's family. All attendees confirmed the evidence left by Ahn Sahng-hong, recognizing Kim Joo-cheol as his successor and Zahng Gil-jah (Note: Korean: 장길자; jang-gil-ja) (born 1943) as the spiritual bride established by Ahn Sahng-hong. However, in April, members of two out of the thirteen churches refused to acknowledge Ahn Sahng-hong and Zahng Gil-jah as God. They separated and formed the New Covenant Passover Church of God.

Both groups claim him as their founder and Christ. However, while the World Mission Society Church of God refers to him as God, the New Covenant Passover Church of God calls him a teacher.

=== Witnesses of Ahn Sahng-hong Church of God ===
One group, consisting of 11 out of the 13 churches, recognized Kim Joo-cheol (Note: Korean: 김주철; gim-ju-cheol) as the successor and Zahng Gil-jah as the spiritual bride. Kim Joo-cheol declared Ahn Sahng-hong as the Second Coming Christ. On a meeting in Seoul on 2 June 1985, they discussed how to call Zahng Gil-jah, and changed the church's name to Witnesses of Ahn Sahng-hong Church of God. (Note: Korean: 하나님의교회 안상홍 증인회。 The name is reflected in the domain name WATV.ORG registered in February 2000 the acronym standing for Witnesses of Ahnsahnghong Television.Korean: 하나님의교회 안상홍 증인회 can be seen in other translations, e.g. a more direct word order "Church of God, Witnesses of Ahn Sahng-hong", or "Church of God, Association of Ahnsahnghong's Witnesses".) Two major new doctrines were codified

- Ahn Sahng-hong should be regarded as Jesus Christ who had already came, should be titled Christ Ahn Sahng-hong, and pursuant to a traditional trinitarian view of Christian hypostasis Ahn was consequently also The Holy Spirit, God the Father, and thus God.
- Zahng Gil-jah should be regarded as God the Mother, a female image of God, be titled Heavenly Mother, or simply Mother, and together with Ahn Sahng-hong be regarded as God.

A change in religious practice, as reflected in the change of name from "Jesus Witnesses" to "Witnesses of Ahn Sahng-hong", was that prayers were no longer conducted in the name of Jesus Christ but in the name of Christ Ahn Sahng-hong. Around 1997, Witnesses of Ahn Sahng-hong Church of God had established a non-profit organization titled the World Mission Society Church of God for the purpose of registering and managing the organization's assets.

=== New Covenant Passover Church of God ===
Another group consisting of 2 out of 13 churches: Busan and Ulsan. Among them were Ahn's wife and their three children. According to the minutes they provided on 10 January 1985, the church was renamed as the New Covenant Passover Church of God. (Note: Korean: 새언약 유월절 하나님의교회) Ahn's son Ahn Kwang-sup (Note: Korean: 안광섭; an-gwang-seop) (born 1954) is an elder in the church and continues to expound on his father's work. At first, they opposed acknowledging Ahn Sahng-hong as the Second Coming of Christ and the doctrine of God the Mother. From 2007, they changed their doctrine to acknowledge Ahn Sahng-hong as the Second Coming of Christ but continued to pray in the name of Jesus. They claimed that they had 25 truth books published by Ahn Sahng-hong, 37 books about his growth and 10 handwritten notes. At present, there are seven churches in total, including Songpa Church in Seoul. The church observes the Sabbath and seven feasts, including Passover. Due to the calculation of feasts, the Church of God in Gwangan-ri, Busan, was to be independent from the New Covenant Passover Church of God in 2016 and also opposed the doctrine of God the Mother. An outside observer visited this church and commented, "The service performed at the New Covenant Church is not much different from that of mainstream churches."

=== Eschatology ===
Ahn claimed that the present day is the last era. In his book 'The Mystery of God and the Spring of the Water of Life' (1980) he interpreted the year 1988, which is 40 years after the independence of Israel in 1948, as the year of the end. (Note: "Since the Israeli nation came to independence in 1948, it makes it 1988 40 years after. Will the world really come to an end at that time? Or will there only be a minor change in the Israeli nation like what happened in the past? As Jesus said "As soon as its twigs gettender and its leaves come out, you know that summer is near. Even so, when you see allthese things, you know that it is near, right at the door" it will surely come to an end at that time." -The Mystery of God and the Spring of the Water of Life (1980) Ahn sahnghong) In his book 'The Bridegroom Was a Long Time in Coming, and They All Became Drowsy and Fell Asleep' (1985) he interpreted the year of the end varies, suggesting both 1988 and 2012. (Note: "Since the day that the Ten Commandments was received, it took 168 days to build the tabernacle and to hold the ceremony, and as the fulfillment of this prophecy, Jesus also went into the heavenly Most Holy on the tenth day of the seventh month in 1844 which is the Day of Atonement, and since then began to build the heavenly temple for 168 days namely 168 days until the ceremony. The prophecy is to be interpreted as 1 day to 1 year. Therefore, adding 168 years to 1844 when Jesus entered the heavenly Most Holy, 2012 becomes the last day." -The Bridegroom Was a Long Time in Coming, and They All Became Drowsy and Fell Asleep (1985) Ahn sahnghong) However, in the same book, he interpreted 1988 as the year of the end while also claiming that it marks the point when the Bridegroom comes slowly. He emphasized that salvation does not depend on knowing the day of the end but rather on believing in and obeying the truth of the new covenant. (Note: "The day of the Lord's coming is predetermined, and He mentioned 'the bridegroom was a long time in coming, and they all became drowsy and fell asleep' making it a truly difficult matter to comprehend. However, to those who believe in and obey the new covenant, eternal life is granted. Salvation does not depend on knowing or not knowing that specific date; rather, it depends on understanding, believing, and obeying the truth of the new covenant." -The Bridegroom Was a Long Time in Coming, and They All Became Drowsy and Fell Asleep (1985), Ahn sahnghong) His eschatology influenced the successor church.

=== Spiritual Bride ===
==== Ahn's Doctrines about the spiritual bride ====
Ahn Sahng-hong interpreted the ‘Bride of Christ' as the ‘church' or ‘saints' in his books. (Note: "Visitors from the Angelic World" mentioned, Adam represents Jesus who was in the world of angels before the creation, and Eve represents the angels whom Jesus loved.) However, in his book 'The Mystery of God and the Spring of the Water of Life,' published in 1980, Ahn Sahng-hong mentioned in the sixth-day creation diagram, 'In the last days, the Spirit and the Bride will appear and lead all Gentile people.' According to this reference, the Spirit and the Bride are interpreted as two saviors.

Among the successor churches, the 'World Mission Society Church of God,' claims the doctrine of God the Mother based on Ahn Sahng-hong's interpretation of the spiritual bride as the savior. However, the 'New Covenant Passover Church of God' opposes the doctrine of God the Mother, citing Ahn Sahng-hong's interpretation of the spiritual bride as the saints.

==== Two Spiritual Brides ====
In the Church of God, two ‘spiritual brides,’ appeared. Both of these individuals were female evangelists, and their relationship with Ahn Sahng-hong was neither familial nor physical. Ahn Sahng-hong left very contrasting information regarding the two spiritual brides. After Ahn Sahng-hong's passing, this became one of the reasons for the division of the church.

One person is Um Soo-in (1941). (Note: Korean: 엄수인; eom-su-in) She began self-proclaiming herself as the 'Heavenly Jerusalem' and the 'spiritual bride' from 1982, claiming that removing the regulation of the head veil for women was her mission. However, the Bible clearly explains about veil worship in 1 Corinthians 11:1-6. Despite clear evidence in the Bible, she made her claims into a book and distributed it, gathering followers within the church. Ahn Sahng-hong immediately refuted her claims. He traveled to churches and gave sermons refuting her claims, and in 1983, he produced and distributed two booklets refuting her claims. In July 1983, she was expelled from the church. (Note: The booklets distributed by Ahn Sahng-hong to refute Um Soo-in's claims were titled ’Interpretation and Explanation of the matter of the Bride and the matter of the Veil’ and ’Interpretation of the New Jerusalem, the Bride, and the matter of the Women’s Veil.’ In the preface of both booklets, it was explicitly stated 'From now on, let us examine and study the errors in the books written by Um Soo-in one by one,’ indicating that these booklets were intended to refute Um Soo-in’s claims. Interpretation of the New Jerusalem, the Bride, and the matter of the Women’s Veil. (1983) Ahn Sahng-hong,) Based on Ahn Sahng-hong's sermons and booklets refuting Um Soo-in's claims, the New Covenant Passover Church of God claims that Ahn Sahng-hong never taught the doctrine of God the Mother.

The other person is Zahng Gil-jah (1943). World Mission Society Church of God claims that Ahn Sang-hong established her as the spiritual bride. One of the pieces of evidence that Ahn Sang-hong established her as the Spiritual Bride is a photograph from the last Passover service on April 15, 1984. (Note: Ahn Sahng-hong conducted the last Passover service in the wedding hall, lighting blue and red candles, symbols of the wedding ceremony. Although it was customary for the presider to lead the prayers from the podium, he invited her to the preacher's pulpit and entrusted her with leading the closing prayer.) Another photo was taken on May 18, 1984, of Ahn Sahng-hong and Zahng Gil-jah wearing rented wedding attire at a wedding hall. In addition to the photos, the church claims that Ahn Sahng-hong taught the doctrine of God the Mother based on booklets and notes left by him. They also claim that because Ahn Sahng-hong had the mission of Elijah, which is to testify to the coming Christ, another savior must appear after him. (Note: this discourse is not my private speech, nor is it learned from anyone. But when our Lord Jesus Christ shone on me and gave me this light, the whole world looked like a dark night. When he shines his light on all sides of the earth, no one can receive it. Finally, it struck me and another person, who was still a child. This man is the one I will come to in the future. When the time comes, he will appear. The Secret of the Seven Thunders (1955) Ahn sahng-hong) (Note: Ahn Sahng-hong's "Walk with God" sermon notes have the following content: "Jesus keeps the Sabbath, so I keep the Sabbath; Jesus keeps the Passover, so I also keep the Passover; Jesus keeps the Feast of Tabernacles, so I also keep the shed Festival; Jesus was baptized, so I followed him to be baptized. Elisha followed Elijah; Joshua followed Moses; Peter followed Jesus; I followed mother" Ahn sahng-hong's handwritten note)

=== Date of baptism ===
- The controversy over his baptism date

The central argument to the claim that Ahn Sahng-hong should be the Second Coming of Jesus is the proposition that he fulfilled a Davidic prophecy by preaching 37 years from his baptism on 16 December 1948 to his death on 25 February 1985. It is said that Ahn Sahng-hong once wrote that he was baptized in 1948, however, the source for the baptismal date of 16 December 1948 performed by a Pastor Lee Myeong-deok in Incheon is obscure, and no written record exists. In 2011, a protocol from the Seventh-day Adventist Church was discovered, stating Ahn was baptised when he was 36 years old on 9 October 1954 by Pastor Gim Seo-gyeong. The investigation by International Korean Christian Coalition Against Heresy (Note: Korean: 세계한인기독교이단대책연합회; International Korean Christian Coalition against Heresy) showed, that while Pastor Gim could be confirmed, no Pastor Lee Myeong-deok was with the church in 1948, thus reducing the length of the ministry of Ahn from 36 years to 30 years and 4 months. (Note: Previously a baptismal date of 16 December 1948 performed by a Pastor Lee Myeong-deok in Incheon has been reported, but the source for this date and name is obscure, and no written record exists. The published references writes that with a 1948 baptism the ministry of Ahn was c. 37 years (1948–1985), which has been used in argument for him fulfilling a Davidic prophecy being the Second Coming of Jesus, the use of the honorific Christ Ansanghong, and the assertion by the World Mission Society Church of God that he ascended to Heaven rather than died. The investigation by The International Korean Christian Coalition against Heresy of the protocol from the Seventh-day Adventist Church stating Ahn was baptised on 9 October 1954 by a Pastor Gim Seo-gyeong showed, that while Pastor Gim could be confirmed, no Pastor Lee Myeong-deok was with the church in 1948.)

- The counterargument to the claim of baptism in 1954

Ahn Sahng-hong noted in several writings and his Bible that he was baptized in Nakseom, Incheon, in 1948. He had already received a revelation in 1953 and began to make arguments against the doctrine of the Seventh-day Adventist Church. Thus, the claim that he was baptized in 1954 does not align with his life and actions. Furthermore, the record in controversy was not the original baptism registry but a membership list created by a newly established church starting from 1958. Therefore, the reliability of this record cannot be verified without comparison to the original baptism registry or records from the church before his transfer. However, no original records have been provided. Moreover, proponents of the 1948 baptism argue that the absence of records can be attributed to the Korean War, which began in 1950. They suggest that the widespread destruction of facilities likely led to the loss of such records.

== See also ==
- List of messiah claimants
- List of people claimed to be Jesus
