= George Sadler =

English footballer

Personal information
- Full name: George Handel Sadler
- Date of birth: 7 May 1915
- Place of birth: Whitwell, England
- Date of death: 30 December 2004 (aged 89)
- Place of death: Burnley, England
- Position: Full-back

Senior career*
| Years | Team | Apps | (Gls) |
- Gainsborough Trinity
| 1938–1947 | West Ham United | 1 | (0) |
- Guildford City
- * Club domestic league appearances and goals

George Handel Sadler (7 May 1915 – 30 December 2004) was an English footballer who played as a full-back.

== Career ==
Sadler began his career at Gainsborough Trinity. In December 1938, Sadler signed for West Ham United. Due to the outbreak of World War II, Sadler did not make his debut until 7 December 1946, playing in a 4–2 defeat away to Southampton. This game was Sadler's only appearance for West Ham, as well as his only Football League appearance. In 1947, Sadler signed for Guildford City. On 26 April 1954, West Ham sent a team to Guildford City for a benefit match for Sadler. Guildford won 4–2.
