= Ray Eastwood =

English footballer

Personal information
- Full name: Raymond Eastwood
- Date of birth: 1 January 1915
- Place of birth: Moston, England
- Date of death: 1999 (age 83 or 84)
- Position: Full back

Senior career*
Years	Team	Apps	(Gls)
- Altrincham
1938–1939	Aldershot	9	(0)
1946–1947	Accrington Stanley	3	(0)
1947–1948	Nelson		
1948–1950	Mossley		
Total		12	(0)
- * Club domestic league appearances and goals

Raymond Eastwood (1 January 1915 – after 1946) is an English retired professional footballer who played as a full back in the Football League.

In 1948 he signed for Mossley making 102 appearances in two seasons with the club.
