= Heinz Flotho =

German footballer

Personal information
- Date of birth: 23 February 1915
- Date of death: 29 January 2000 (aged 84)
- Position: Goalkeeper

Senior career*
Years	Team	Apps	(Gls)
- VfL Osnabrück

International career
1939	Germany	1	(0)
- * Club domestic league appearances and goals

Heinz Flotho (23 February 1915 – 29 January 2000) was a German international footballer.
