= Lance Hall =

English footballer

Personal information
- Full name: Lancelot Hall
- Date of birth: 23 January 1915
- Place of birth: Darlington, England
- Date of death: 26 February 1985 (aged 70)
- Place of death: Barrow-in-Furness, England
- Positions: Left back; centre half

Senior career*
Years	Team	Apps	(Gls)
193?–1937	Cockfield		
1937–1938	Luton Town	0	(0)
1938–1949	Barrow	108	(1)
- * Club domestic league appearances and goals

Lancelot Hall (23 January 1915 – 26 February 1985) was an English professional footballer who made 108 appearances in the Football League playing as a left back or centre half for Barrow. He was with Barrow from 1938 to 1949, after which he retired. Before joining them, he played non-league football for Cockfield and was on the books of Luton Town without appearing for their league side.

Hall was born in Darlington, County Durham, in 1915 and died in Barrow-in-Furness, Cumbria, in 1985 at the age of 70.
