= Darroch (surname) =

Darroch is a surname. Notable people with the surname include:

- Arnold Darroch (1898–1974), Canadian politician
- Bob Darroch (born 1940), New Zealand illustrator, author and cartoonist
- Jacqueline E. Darroch, American reproductive health specialist
- Jenny Darroch (born 1963), New Zealand academic administrator in the United States
- Jeremy Darroch (born 1962), British businessman
- Johnny Darroch (1871–1949), Scottish footballer
- Kim Darroch (born 1954), British diplomat
- Malcolm Darroch (born 1938), Scottish footballer
