= Laws Hall =

Laws Hall may refer to:

- Laws Hall (Miami University), library
- Laws Hall (University of Missouri), residence hall

== See also ==
- Lawshall, village in Suffolk, England
