= Reid Hall (Miami University) =

- Interactive map of the Reid Hall area

General information
- Type: Dormitory
- Architectural style: Georgian
- Location: Miami University, Oxford, Ohio
- Coordinates: 39.5111°N 084.7301°W
- Construction started: 1948
- Demolished: 2006
- Cost: $795,200

Technical details
- Floor area: 50,949 sq ft (4,733.3 m^{2})

Design and construction
- Architect: Charles Cellarius

Other information
- Seating capacity: 142 residence

Reid Hall (1948–2006) was a dormitory at Miami University in Oxford, Ohio, that housed about 140 students. However, it was not just a place where students lived. After a shooting occurred in 1959, the building became known as one of the most haunted buildings on campus. It was torn down in order to make room for the Farmer School of Business, but has been recreated within a set of buildings called Heritage Commons.

== History ==
=== Whitelaw Reid ===
Reid Hall was named after Whitelaw Reid, a former Miami student from the class of 1856. Whitelaw later became a diplomat and a journalist. He also ran as vice-president of the United States with Benjamin Harrison in 1892. He died on December 15, 1912, and remained a loyal Miami Alumnus throughout his life.

=== A Murder ===
On May 9, 1959, two men began fighting within Reid Hall. The Resident Advisor, Roger Sayles, tried to stop the fight, but was accidentally shot in the process. The shooter then ran to Ogden Hall and took his own life just moments after the first death. Legend states that after Sayles was shot, he reached for a door leaving behind a bloody hand print. (Stories vary as to whether it was two hand prints or just one). Many students claimed that the hand prints refused to fade and were still visible on the wood.

=== Other Events ===
On Easter Weekend in 1987, Reid Hall caught fire which led to $500,000 worth of damage

As of December 10, 2004, Miami University announced that Reid Hall would be torn down in order to make room for the creation of a new building. According to an article in the Miami Student, Reid Hall destruction was suggested by current Miami President, James C. Garland. In response to this news, 607 people signed a petition led by 2004 Miami Grad, Katie Goodhew, in an attempt to save the beloved hall from destruction. The petition was passed along through the web with outlets such as e-mail and networking. Goodhew got the word out through a blanket e-mail to friends, the Residence Hall Association, National Residence Hall Honorary and current student leaders at Reid Hall. According to the article, only 50% of the petition signers actually lived in Reid Hall. Goodhew explained that it was because many students were upset to see the famous hall torn down. This article was written April 26, 2005. However, the board did not find the petition convincing and decided to build the Farmer School of Business in its place.

== Present Existence ==
Reid Hall was torn down in order to make room for the new Farmer School of Business in 2005. President Jim Garland's recommendation of using Reid Hall's location was accepted by the board and construction ensued. Within that same year, a “new” Reid Hall was built within Heritage Commons. The new hall is “one of six apartment-style living accommodations” that is available for upper class and graduate students.

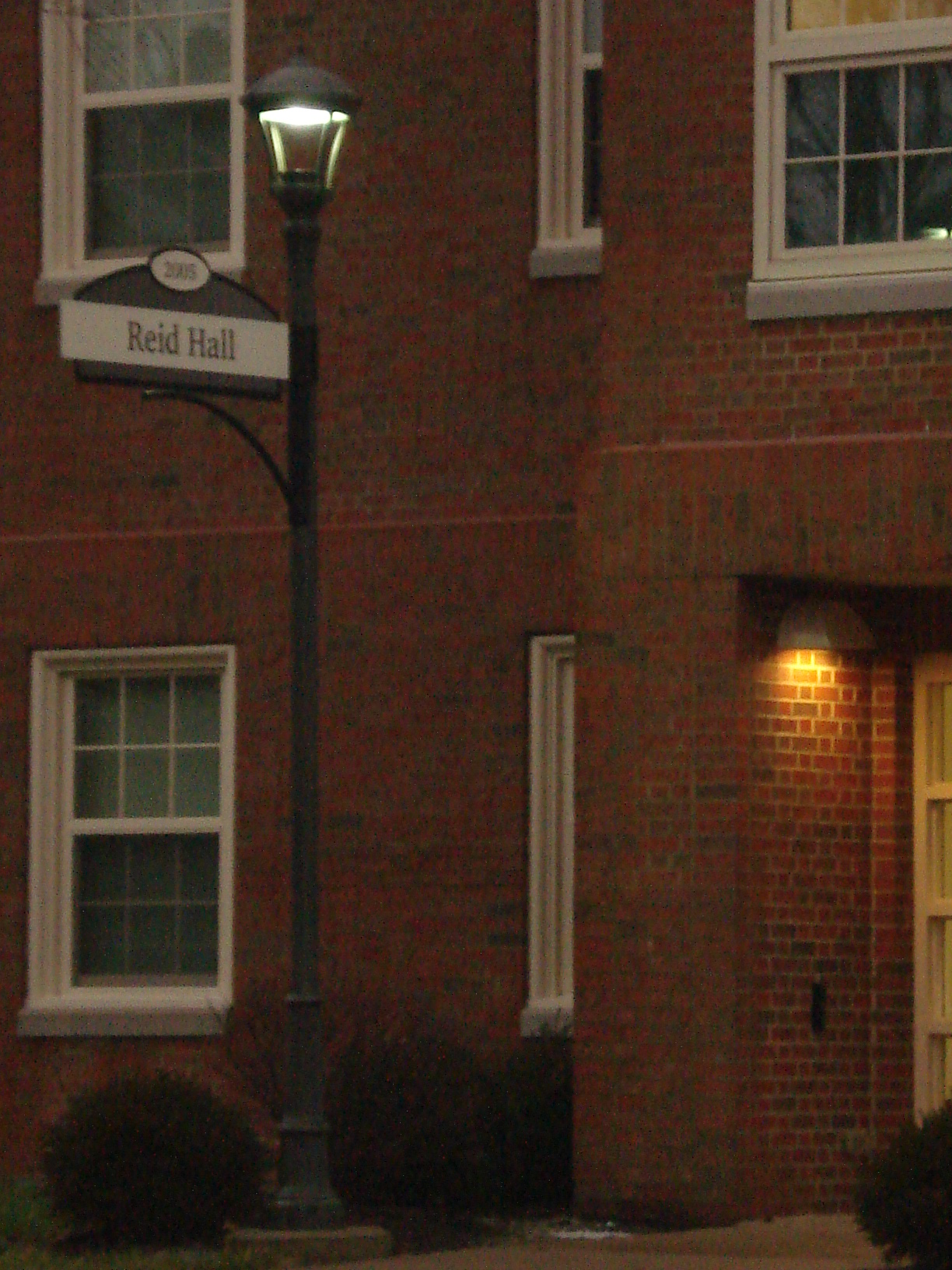
New Reid Hall

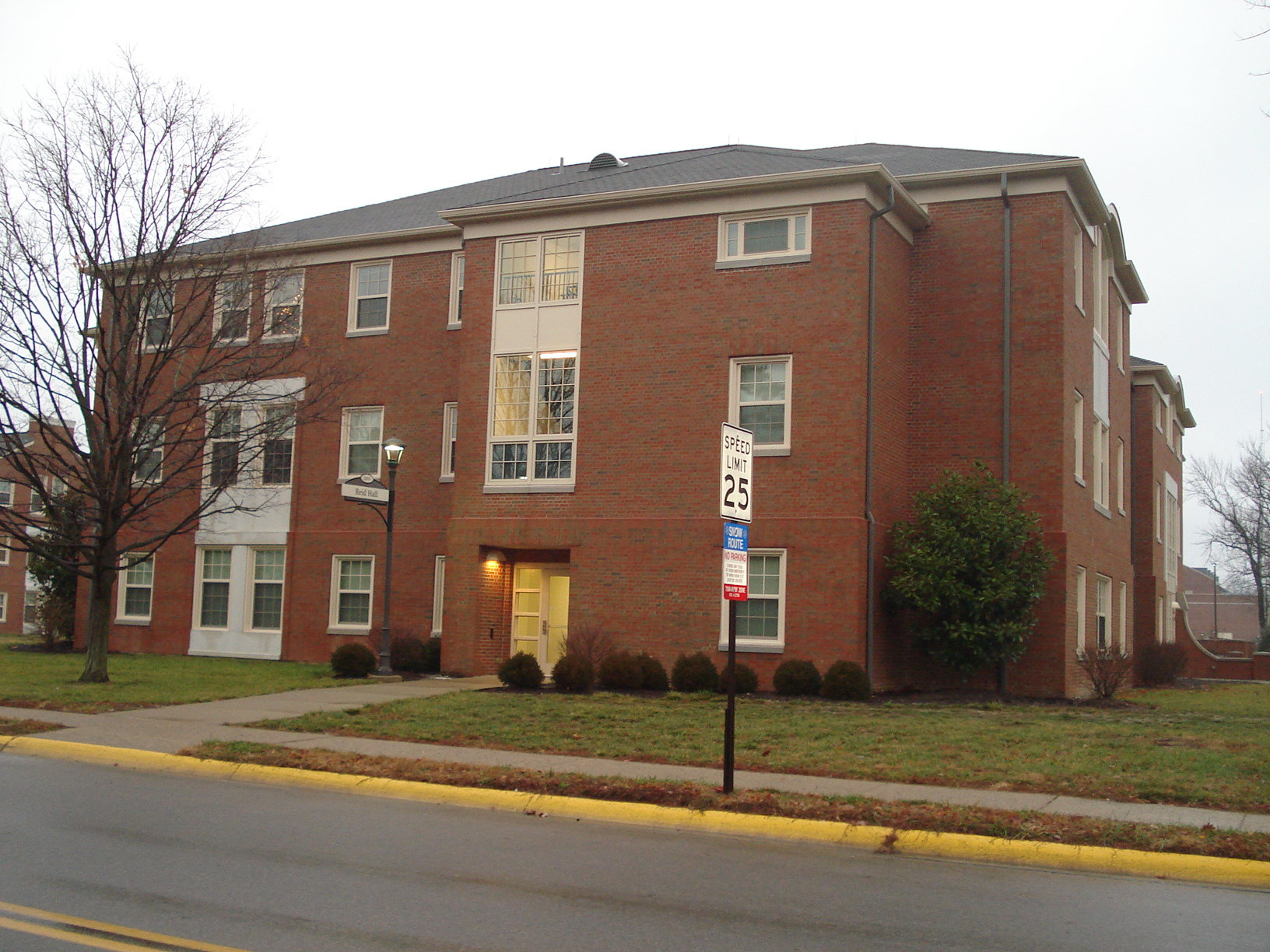
New Reid
