= Scott Farmer =

Scott Farmer may refer to:

- Scott Farmer (businessman) (born 1959), former chief executive officer of Cintas
- Scott Farmer (politician) (born 1962), councillor for Stirling (council area)
