= Darroch =

Darroch may refer to:

- Darroch (surname) (with a list of people surnamed Darroch)
- Clan Darroch, a Scottish clan
- Darroch Hall in HM Prison Greenock, Scotland, accommodates female offenders
- Darroch Ball, New Zealand politician
