= Farmer School of Business =

Business school of Miami University (Ohio)

Coordinates: 39°30′41″N 84°43′47″W

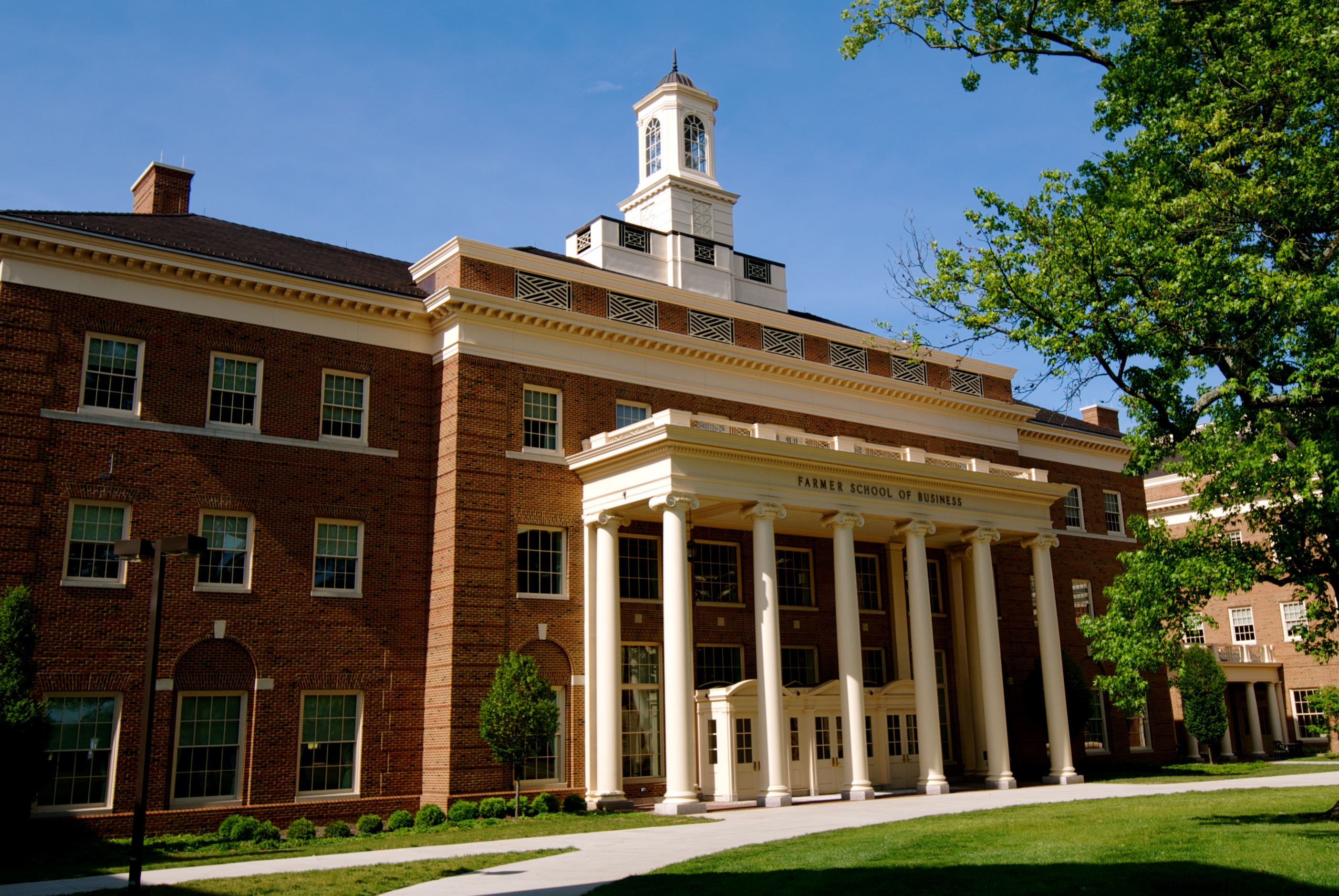
- Motto: Prodesse Quam Conspici
- Motto in English: To Accomplish Rather Than To Be Conspicuous
- Type: Undergraduate and graduate business school
- Established: 1928; 98 years ago
- Parent institution: Miami University
- Affiliations: AACSB
- Dean: Jenny Darroch
- Faculty: 220
- Undergraduates: 4,790 (2021)
- Location: Oxford, Ohio, United States
- Campus: 2,000 acres (810 ha)
- Website: miamioh.edu/fsb

The Farmer School of Business (FSB) is an American business school that is part of the Miami University, a public research university in Oxford, Ohio. Established in 1928, the school is named after alumnus and benefactor Richard T. Farmer, founder of Cintas. FSB awards undergraduate and graduate degrees across its accounting, economics, entrepreneurship, analytics, management, and marketing departments. The school is accredited by AACSB International. The FSB emphasizes experiential learning, international study, and leadership development.

== History ==
Miami University's school of business administration was separated from other academic divisions in 1928 and originally located in Irvin Hall. It was later housed in Laws Hall, which was built in 1959 specifically for the business school and named after alumnus Samuel Laws. The business school was named after alumnus and benefactor Richard T. Farmer, founder of Cintas, in 1992.

On December 10, 2004, the university's board of trustees unanimously approved a High Street site, formerly home to Reid Hall (Miami University), for the new Farmer School of Business building after considering eleven locations, including Bishop Woods, which was spared due to a 4,500-signature petition. The project was part of a larger construction initiative, supported by $6.7 million from alumnus William Mayhall through the Love and Honor alumni group and major donations from Richard T. Farmer and others, totaling $50 million in private contributions. In February 2007, the university issued $83.2 million in general receipt bonds to fund the Farmer School, campus renovations, and construction of the Voice of America campus in West Chester, Ohio.

The Farmer School of Business building was designed by Robert A.M. Stern Architects and Moody Nolan, and opened in the fall of 2009.

== Academics ==
The Farmer School of Business is home to seven departments: Accountancy, Economics, Entrepreneurship, Finance, Human Capital Management & Leadership, Information Systems and Analytics, Marketing, and Supply Chain & Operations Management, offering 11 majors and 13 minors between them. The Farmer School offers seven master's programs, including two that can be completed simultaneously with undergraduate degrees.

The Farmer School houses several academic centers, including the William Isaac and Michael Oxley Center for Business Leadership. The Center for Supply Chain Excellence works with the Supply Chain and Operations Management program. The Center for KickGlass Change is an interdisciplinary center working to increase cultural intelligence and provide societal change programming to Miami University students. L.I.F.E. (Leading the Integration of Faith and Entrepreneurship) was established at Miami University in 2018, led by the John W. Altman Institute for Entrepreneurship's Center for Social Entrepreneurship. A new center at the Farmer School focused on real estate and the finance and investment opportunities involved in it.

== Building ==
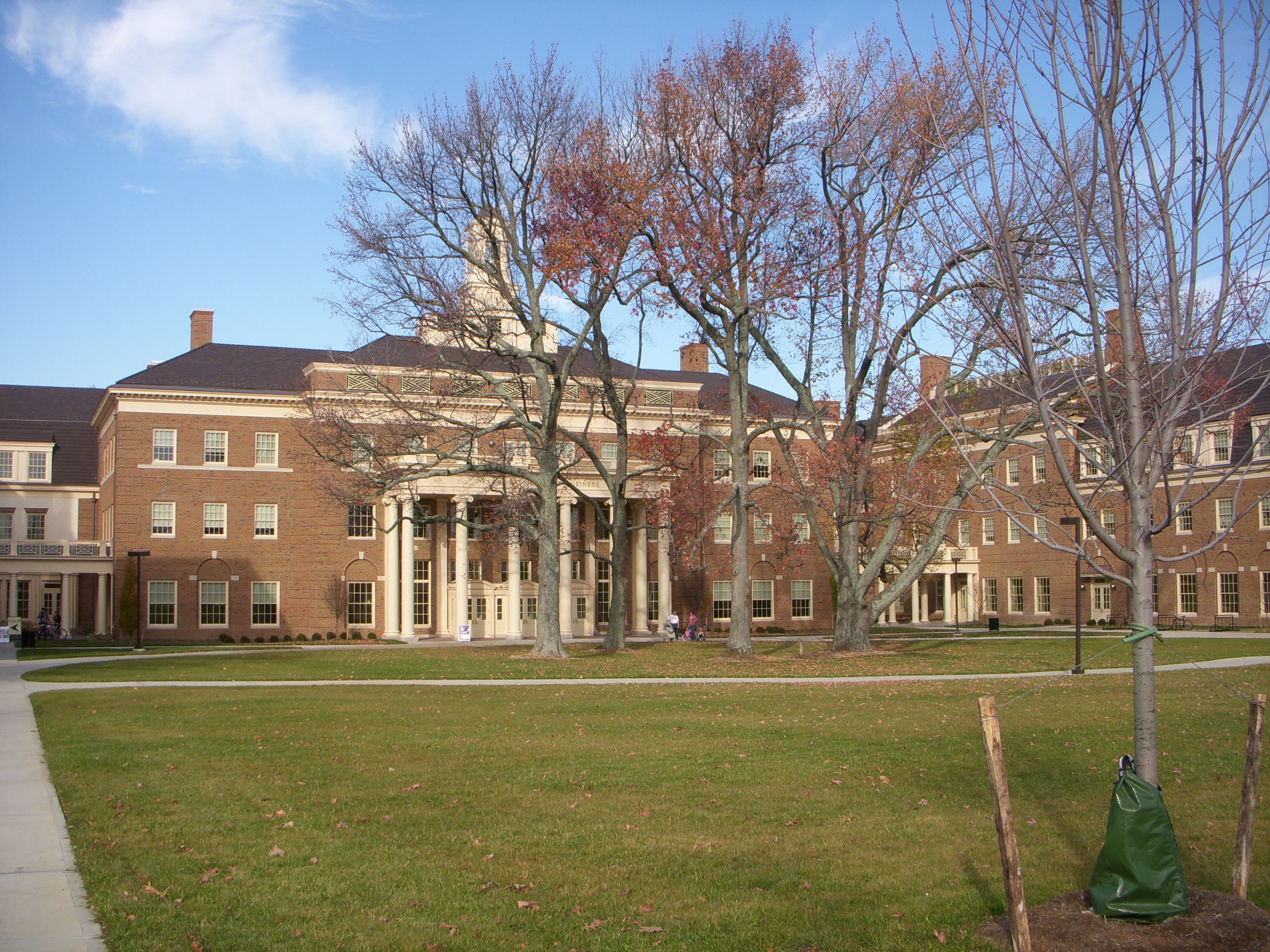
Front landscape of the FSB, from High Street

The Farmer School of Business building was designed by Robert A.M. Stern Architects of New York City and Moody Nolan of Columbus, Ohio. Formal planning began on December 10, 2004, and the building was completed on November 7, 2009. The building took 30 months to complete and was finished ahead of schedule and under budget. It was designed in the Georgian architecture style. It was the first building of the Oxford campus to receive a Leadership in Energy and Environmental Design (LEED) certification.

At 210,000 square feet, the building contains 12 case classrooms, 8 "cluster" rooms, 3 "standard" rooms (one with capabilities to be used as a mock trial room), 3 seminar rooms, 1 trading room, 1 small auditorium (150 persons), 1 large auditorium (500 persons), and 4 teaching labs. There are also 136 faculty offices to house all six Oxford departments. In addition to these rooms and offices, there are also three major centers in the Farmer building. The Thomas C. Page Center for Entrepreneurial Studies, Armstrong Interactive, and Center for Business Excellence are all located in the 800 E. High building.

A major part of the building is the student commons, which is located on the main level. This area is a place for congregation and meetings among students with power outlets and seating and tables. There are also 13 break-out rooms which can be reserved by students or classes. Student organizations also share a suite in the building. The Forsythe Library and Technology Center is located on the main level near the Taylor Auditorium, which is used as a quiet library-like setting for individual study and printing and tech services.

The building also has a dining services location, Dividend$. A café-like location, Dividend$ offers students take-out food for breakfast and lunch during the week. The location serves a la carte items through the university's culinary center as well as four major divisions.

== Rankings ==
In the 2021 Poets & Quants Ranking of Undergraduate Business Programs, the Farmer School ranked 39th among all U.S. undergraduate business schools and 17th among public universities.

== See also ==
- List of United States business school rankings
- List of business schools in the United States
