= Laws Hall (University of Missouri) =

Residence hall, 1957–2017

Coordinates: 38°56′20″N 92°19′52″W

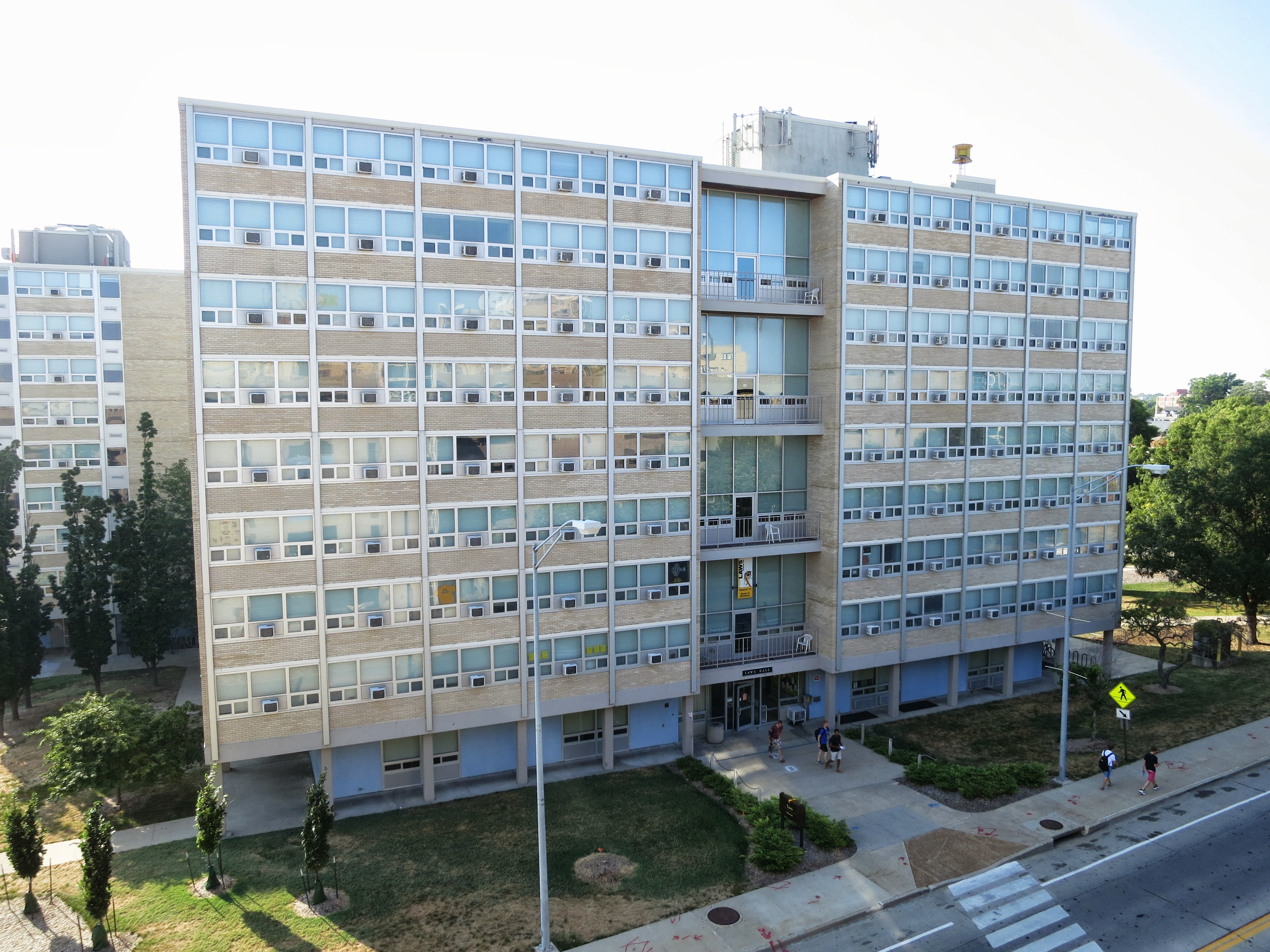
Laws Hall as it appeared from the Maryland Avenue parking garage.

Laws Hall was a residence hall at the University of Missouri. Located at the corner of Tiger Avenue (formerly Maryland Avenue) and Kentucky Boulevard, Laws comprised a gross area of 72,871 square feet (6,769.9 m^{2}) over 9 floors and basement area. The street address was 1005 Tiger Ave. 65201. The structure was constructed in 1957 as a women's residence hall. Eventually made a co-education residence hall, Laws housed students until the end of the 2015–2016 academic year. The building was demolished in March 2017 as part the final phase of the university's residence halls master plan.

== Building history ==
Prior to the construction of Laws Hall, the area of campus was known as Fairway Village. Beginning in 1946 as men returned from the war effort, Fairway Village was a field of trailers that were home to the waves of men and their families returning to begin or complete their college education. As the need for the trailer village areas eventually declined in the 1950s, the area was left prime for development of traditional university residence structures, and Laws was built along with Lathrop and Jones Halls.

Over the summer of 2003, several renovation projects took place to extend the life of the building. All windows in the building were replaced, exterior masonry was extensively cleaned and repaired, upgrades were made to the community bathrooms, the electrical system was upgraded, and individually controlled air conditioning units were installed in each room. Although demolition of the building was originally scheduled for fall 2012 as part of the university's plan to create all new living spaces through renovation and new construction, a 2005 revision of the plan was for Laws Hall to close for renovation in summer 2017 and reopen in fall 2018 as the final component of the current Department of Residential Life Master Plan. In the subsequent revision of the master plan in 2012, Laws was again to planned to be demolished. In June 2013, Laws, Jones, and Lathrop Halls were recommended for demolition as part of the approved Dobbs Replacement Project. Jones Hall closed in December 2014 and was demolished in the spring of 2015.

Laws Hall closed at the beginning of the 2016–2017 academic year. Decreasing enrollment numbers were cited as the reason. The building was demolished in March 2017.

== Origin of building name ==
Laws Hall was named for Samuel Spahr Laws. Laws was President of the University of Missouri from 1876 to 1889. Laws is regarded as one of the more interesting figures in MU history. His active interest in the sciences lead to the establishment of a school of engineering and the building of Laws Observatory, the first observatory west of the Mississippi River, in 1877. Laws established the observatory and the telescope within it with his personal funds, and he also acquired the Thomas Jefferson headstone while in office. As president of the university, the autocratic Laws alienated students, faculty and the state legislature. He attempted to regulate all aspects of student life, and opposed admitting women to the university. Several faculty members resigned. In spite of his generous fundraising for an observatory, students hated Laws. They petitioned to have him fired, especially when he would chase students back to campus on days when students would traditionally cut class. Laws resigned from his position with the university in 1889 amid a scandal that erupted when he purchased the carcass of a circus elephant named Emperor for $1,685 after the legislature had specifically refused to pay for it.

== Notable events ==
- On Friday, October 20, 2006, an explosion occurred in a bathroom stall. The explosion resulted in more than $1,000 in damages.
- On Sunday morning, February 26, 2006, freshman business major Kyle Masterson died after falling from the eighth floor east balcony of the residence hall. The incident was ruled as an apparent suicide, and a note was found in Masterson's room to support the ruling.
- In April 1998, Ivan Sychov was found dead in his room, room 300, on the third floor of Laws Hall. Sychov was a 20-year-old business major and native of Omsk, Russia. The cause of death was ruled as an accidental self-inflected hanging (auto-erotic asphyxiation in this case).
- In January 1992, freshman Colin Prock fell five floors down the elevator shaft to his death when he jumped from an elevator that was stalled between the third and fourth floors of the residence hall. The elevator had stalled after 15 students packed into it.
- In January 1982, an escaped prisoner was found hiding out in the residence hall. Barry Lauderdale had been sentenced in Boonville to two years in the state penitentiary, but he escaped through a fourth floor window of University Hospital where he had been brought for an examination. University police apprehended the prisoner and escorted him out of the building in leg irons.
