= Richard T. Farmer =

American businessman (died 2021)

Richard Thirl Farmer
- Born: November 22, 1934; Dayton, Kentucky, U.S.
- Died: August 4, 2021 (aged 86)
- Education: Miami University
- Spouse: Joyce Elaine Barnes (m. 1957)

Richard Thirl Farmer (November 22, 1934 – August 4, 2021) was an American businessman known for his tenure as chief executive officer of Cintas from 1968 to 2003.

== Career ==
Farmer worked for his father in the family business, Acme Wiper and Industrial Laundry, through childhood, high school, and college. He received a Bachelor of Arts in Business from Miami University in Oxford, Ohio in 1956. At Miami, he became a member of Delta Tau Delta fraternity. After graduation, he served in the United States Marines before being honorably discharged, coming on full-time with the family business in 1957.

In 1959, Farmer's father transferred operation of the business to Richard. In 1962, the company name was changed to Acme Uniform & Towel Supply to reflect the uniform rental growth segment. By 1966, Acme annual revenues had grown to $1.8 million.

In 1968 Farmer created a new company, Satellite Corp., to provide a centralized distribution system and to develop smaller uniform plants in major U.S. cities. In 1973, Satellite acquired Acme and became known as Cintas. The company became publicly traded on the NASDAQ stock exchange in 1983.

He turned Mason, Ohio-based Cintas from a negative net worth of $34,000 into a Fortune 500 company with annual sales of $3.8 billion. Today Cintas works with over 800,000 other clients.

Cintas is not only the nation's leading corporate uniform provider, but beginning in 1996 it greatly diversified and currently manufactures and implements corporate identity uniform programs and provides entrance mats, restroom supplies, promotional products, first aid and safety products, fire protection services and document management services.

Farmer served as Cintas Corporation's CEO from 1968 to August 1, 1995. He served as chairman from 1968 until his retirement on October 20, 2009, when he assumed the role of chairman emeritus and remained on the board of directors.

== Philanthropy ==
He served as a member and chair of the board of directors at Miami University. At Miami, the Farmer School of Business is named for him after Farmer and his wife, Joyce (Barnes) Farmer (whom he married in 1957), provided the cornerstone gift to the school of business in 1992. The Farmer School of Business consistently ranks as one of the best in the U.S. In 2013, it was ranked 22nd overall and eighth among undergraduate business programs at U.S. public universities, according to BusinessWeek.

In 2005, they announced a $30 million leadership gift through the Farmer Family Foundation, of which $25 million helped underwrite the construction of Farmer Hall and $5 million was earmarked for faculty support.

== Associations ==
Farmer was the 15th largest fundraiser for the 2000 election of George W. Bush and raised hundreds of millions of dollars for the Republican Party. Farmer also authored a book, "Rags to Riches."

Farmer was a director for Fifth Third Bancorp, the Lindner Center for Research & Education, Bethesda Inc., Safety-Kleen Corp., Bowne Inc., Home Federal Savings & Loan Association, Midwest Income Investment Company and Eagle Picher Industries Inc.

Farmer was honored as Ernst & Young’s Entrepreneur of the Year in 1995. He was inducted into the Greater Cincinnati Business Hall of Fame in 1996. In 2010, Farmer was honored by the Cincinnati USA Regional Chamber as one of the Great Living Cincinnatians.

== Personal life and death ==
On December 22, 1957, Farmer married fellow Miami University alumnus Joyce Elaine Barnes. They had three children and many grandchildren, great-grandchildren, and nieces and nephews.

Farmer died on August 4, 2021, aged 86, of Parkinson's Disease.

== See also ==
- Miami University
- Farmer School of Business
