= Herron Gymnasium =

Former gymnasium at Miami University in Oxford, Ohio, USA

- Formerly listed on the U.S. National Register of Historic Places
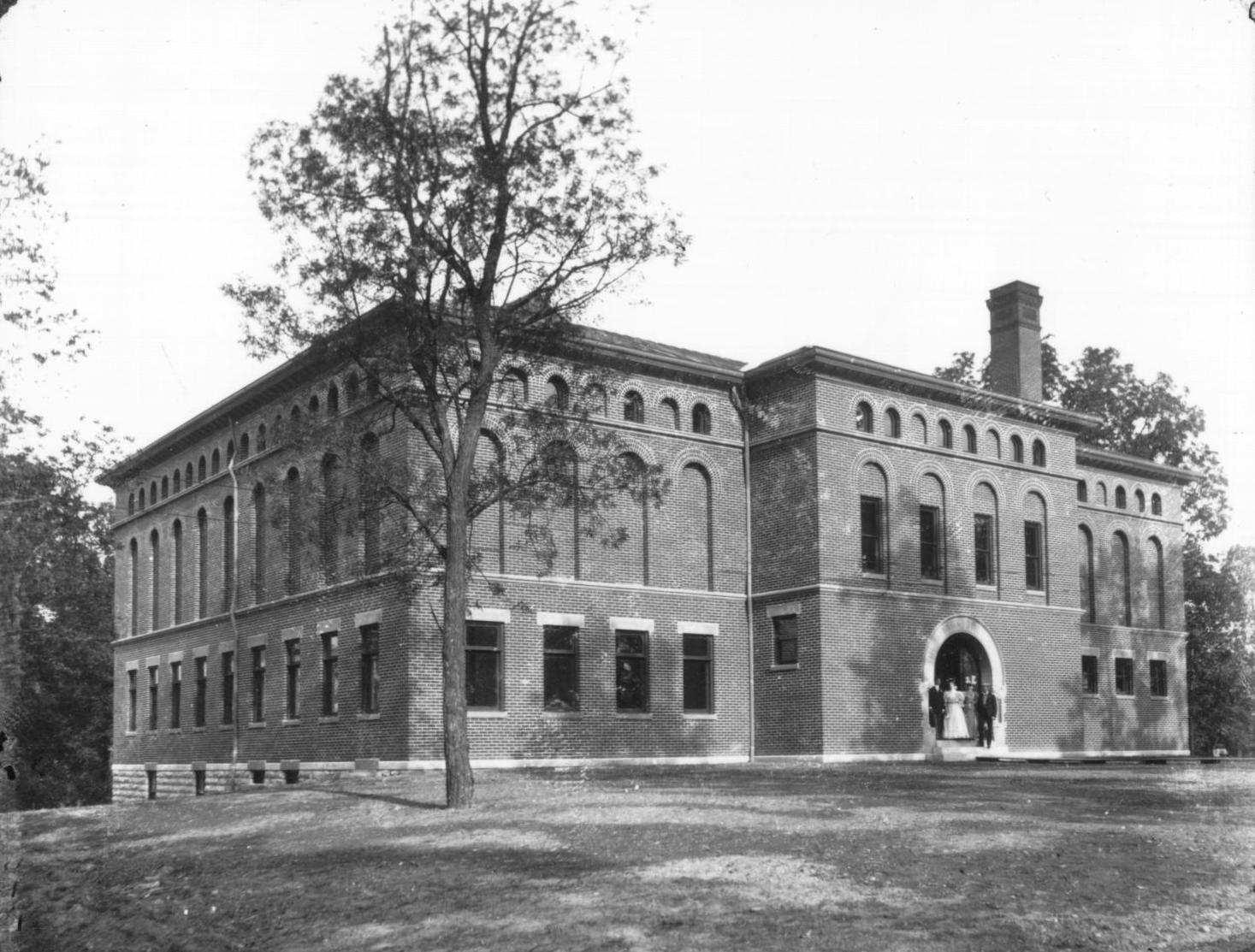
- Herron Gymnasium circa 1897

- Location within Ohio Location within the United States
- Location: Miami University campus, Oxford, Ohio
- Coordinates: 39°30′34″N 84°44′2″W
- Area: less than one acre
- Built: 1897
- Architect: F.E. Townsend, Johnston Brothers Construction
- Architectural style: Romanesque Revival
- Demolished: 1986
- NRHP reference No.: 79001788

Significant dates
- Added to NRHP: November 29, 1979
- Removed from NRHP: 1984

Herron Gymnasium was a gymnasium and classroom building on the Miami University campus in Oxford, Ohio. Later known as Van Voorhis Hall, it was listed in the National Register of Historic Places in November 1979. Originally conceived in 1893, it was constructed in 1897 and named for John W. Herron, a Miami alumnus and Cincinnati judge. It was Miami University's first gymnasium, and would serve as the main recreational center until the construction of Withrow Court in 1932, which led Herron to become a women's gym. Except for an interlude during World War II when it served as a Navy barracks, it served as a women's gym until the construction of "New Herron" (now Phillips Hall) in 1962. In the late 20th century its use diminished to AFROTC and men's intramural sports, and the gymnasium was demolished in 1986 and replaced with a parking lot.

== History ==
The idea for a gymnasium first came about at an 1893 meeting of Miami University's board of trustees. John W. Herron, an 1845 Miami graduate and Cincinnati lawyer who served as president of Miami's Board of Trustees (and eventually became the facility's namesake), served alongside two other men on a committee to plan the facility's construction. In February 1893, the school received $2,500 (approximately $67,000 adjusted for inflation) from the state to furnish the gymnasium. After planning throughout 1896, Miami finally built the gymnasium in 1897, naming it after Herron, who was so modest that he refused to have his name adorn the building; the building's exterior instead read "The Miami Gymnasium".

The building, a rectangular, two-story Romanesque revival-styled building with a truss roof, was constructed by F.E. Townsend, an architect selected by John Herron from nearby Hamilton, and was the school's first gymnasium. The first recorded game at Herron Gymnasium was a 1904 basketball game between the university team and some amateur players. The amateurs won, 13 to 8. Despite that game being the first one officially recorded, the Student notes that women's basketball became organized as early as 1902, between students at the Ohio State Normal School (later to become Miami's College of Education) and regular Miami female students, though it does not specify where the games were played.

In 1923, the building was moved 522 feet east to facilitate construction of Ogden Hall, a new dormitory. Its final site was near the present-day Roudebush Hall, along Oxford's High Street. Herron Gymnasium's remains formed one of Miami's urban legends, that benefactor Laura Louise Ogden Whaling wished for a wall to be built around Ogden Hall to keep it private. Rumors abounded that Miami built the wall, but underground. However, the underground wall was simply an original part of the Herron foundation.

The gym was coeducational until 1931, when it became a women's gym due to the construction of Withrow Court, which was a male-only gym. After the change, students petitioned the board of trustees to rename the building Herron Hall, which they approved in June 1932. The building was used continuously as a women's gym until 1962, except for a brief time during World War II when the gym served as barracks for the Navy Radio School that operated at Miami.

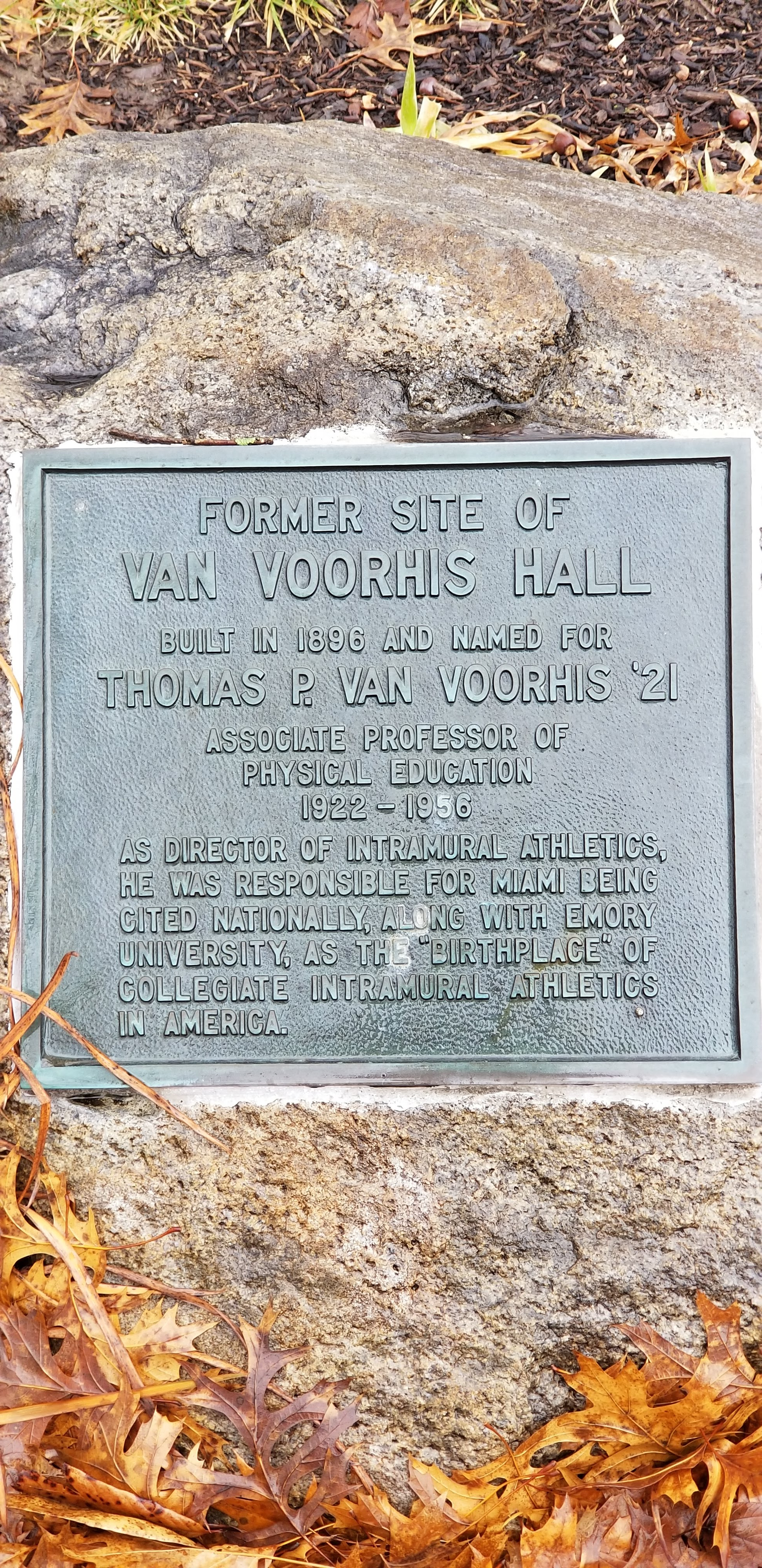
A plaque between Laws and Roudebush Halls that marks the original location of the gymnasium.

In 1962, Miami constructed a new women's recreational facility and transferred the Herron Hall name to that building, which would later be renamed Phillips Hall in honor of Margaret Phillips, director of women's physical education at Miami for over 40 years. The gym then became known as Van Voorhis Hall or Old Herron. The new namesake of this gym was Thomas Van Voorhis, Miami's longtime director of intramural sports. After 1962, the building was primarily used by Miami's AFROTC program and men's intramural sports. Until the building's demolition, it also held a yearly student art show.

Van Voorhis Hall was added under its original name to the National Register of Historic Places in November 1979, but was ordered to be demolished by an 8–1 vote from the board of trustees in 1986. The former gym was replaced with a parking lot near the current site of Roudebush Hall, the university's administration building. Van Voorhis' daughter noted in a letter to the school that the gym, then Miami's oldest academic building "...stuck out like a sore thumb", and said her father would have wished to see it torn down. Sergio Sanabria, a Miami architecture professor, disagreed and called the push to demolish the building "irresponsible" as it was still structurally sound and the cost of renovation would have been comparatively inexpensive. Other faculty said that Herron served as an important part of Miami's identity as the coaching classes held there played a protracted role in developing the Cradle of Coaches at Miami.

== Facilities ==
Herron Gymnasium consisted of two floors and a basement. The first floor held two classrooms and the chapels for the YWCA and YMCA, as well as offices, bathrooms, and dressing rooms. The gym took up the entire second floor, and had an elevated track.

== Gallery ==
Images of the Herron Gymnasium
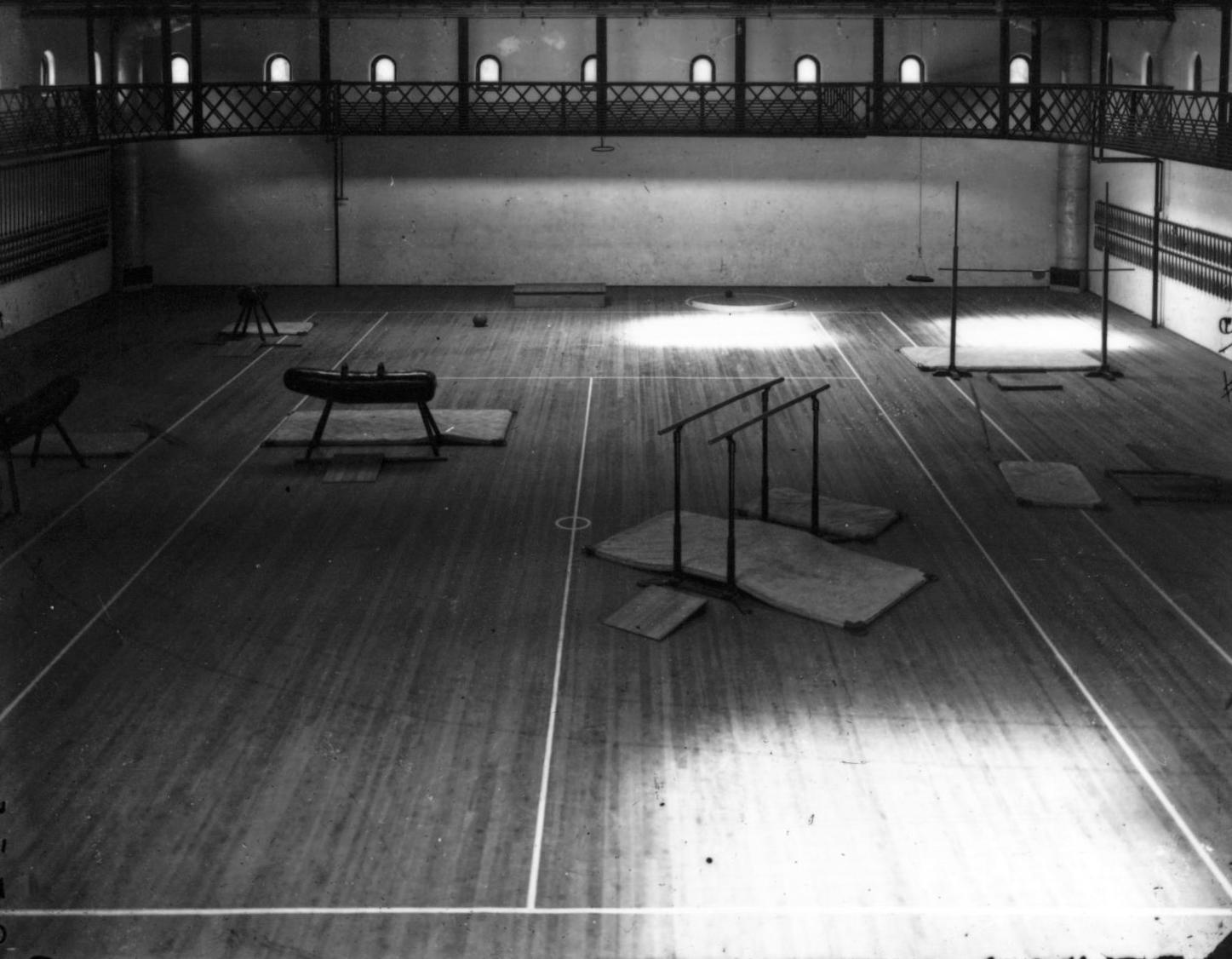
Interior of Herron Gymnasium, circa 1898

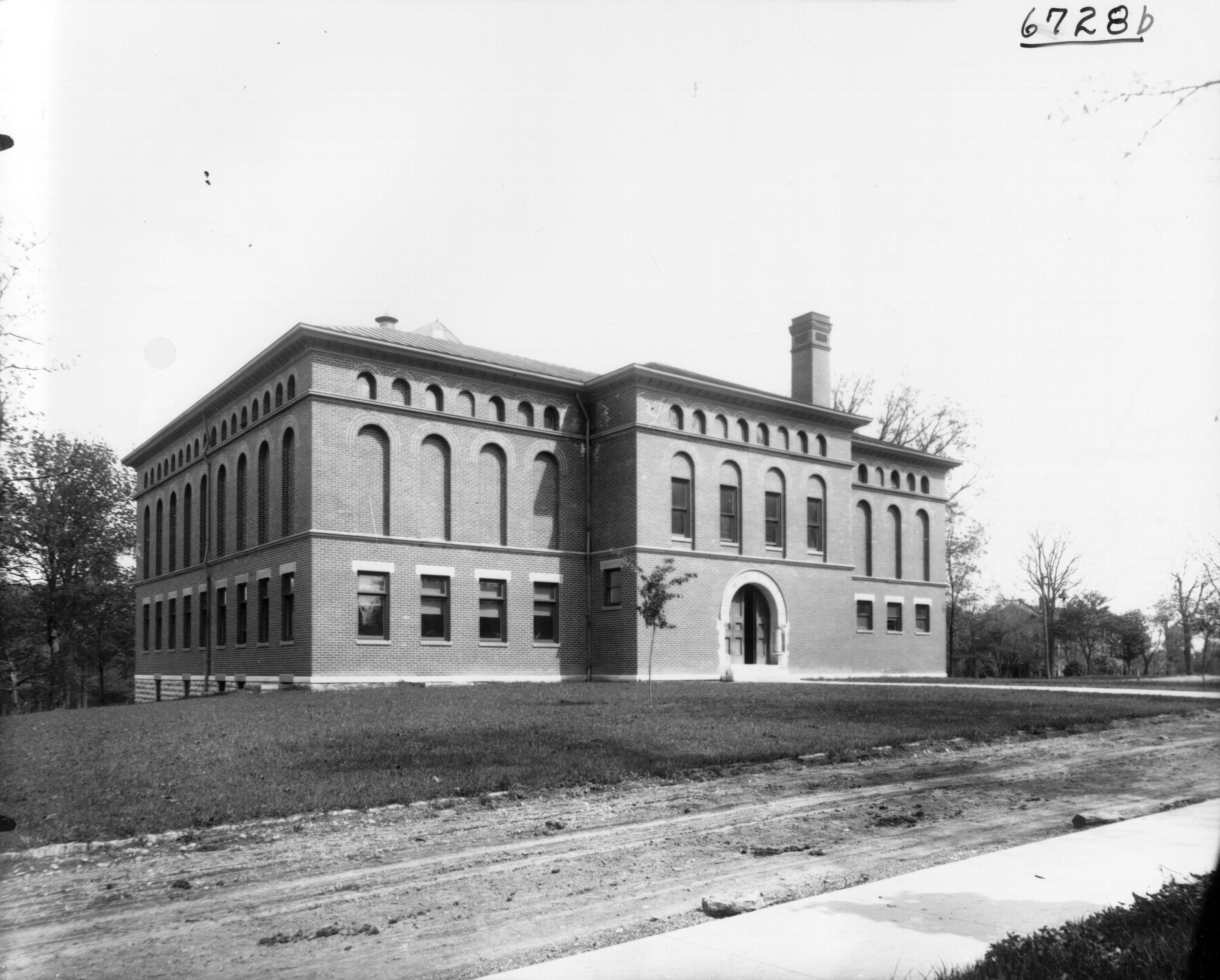
Exterior of Herron Gymnasium circa 1905

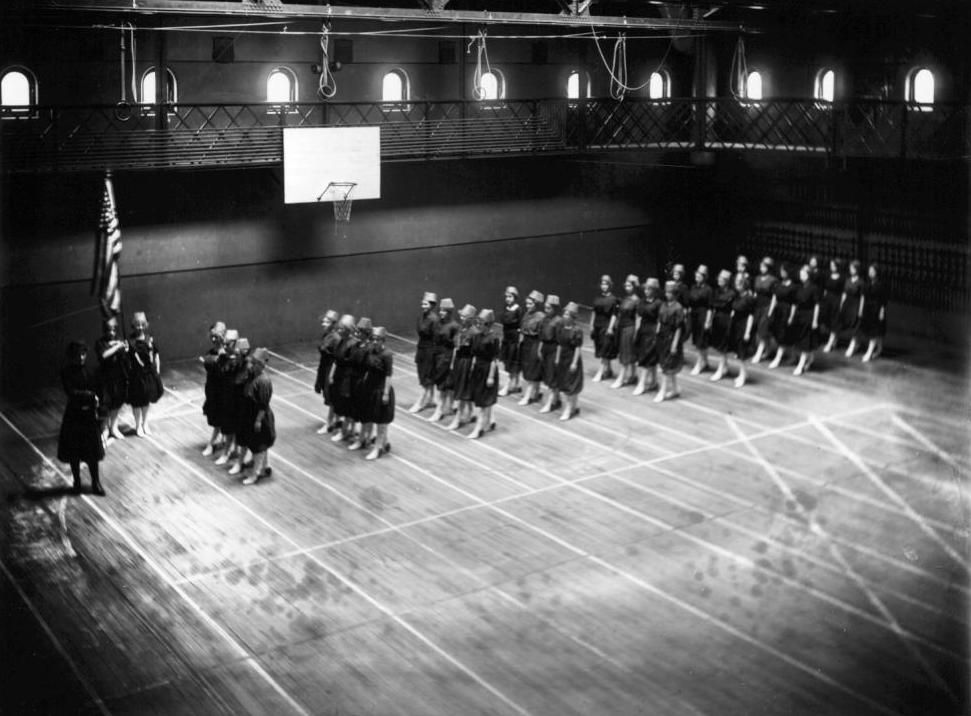
Women's assembly circa 1912

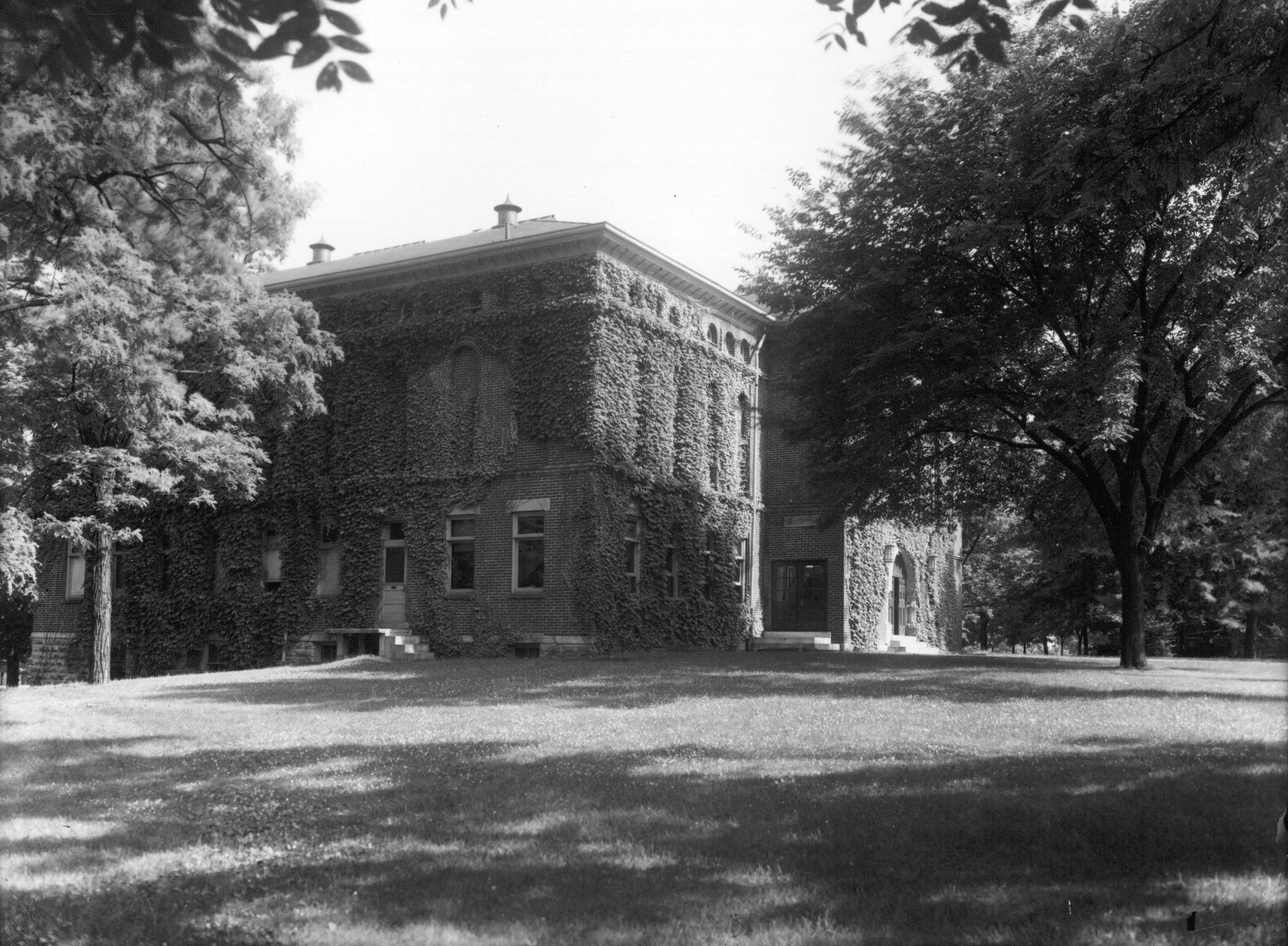
Undated photo of Herron with ivy

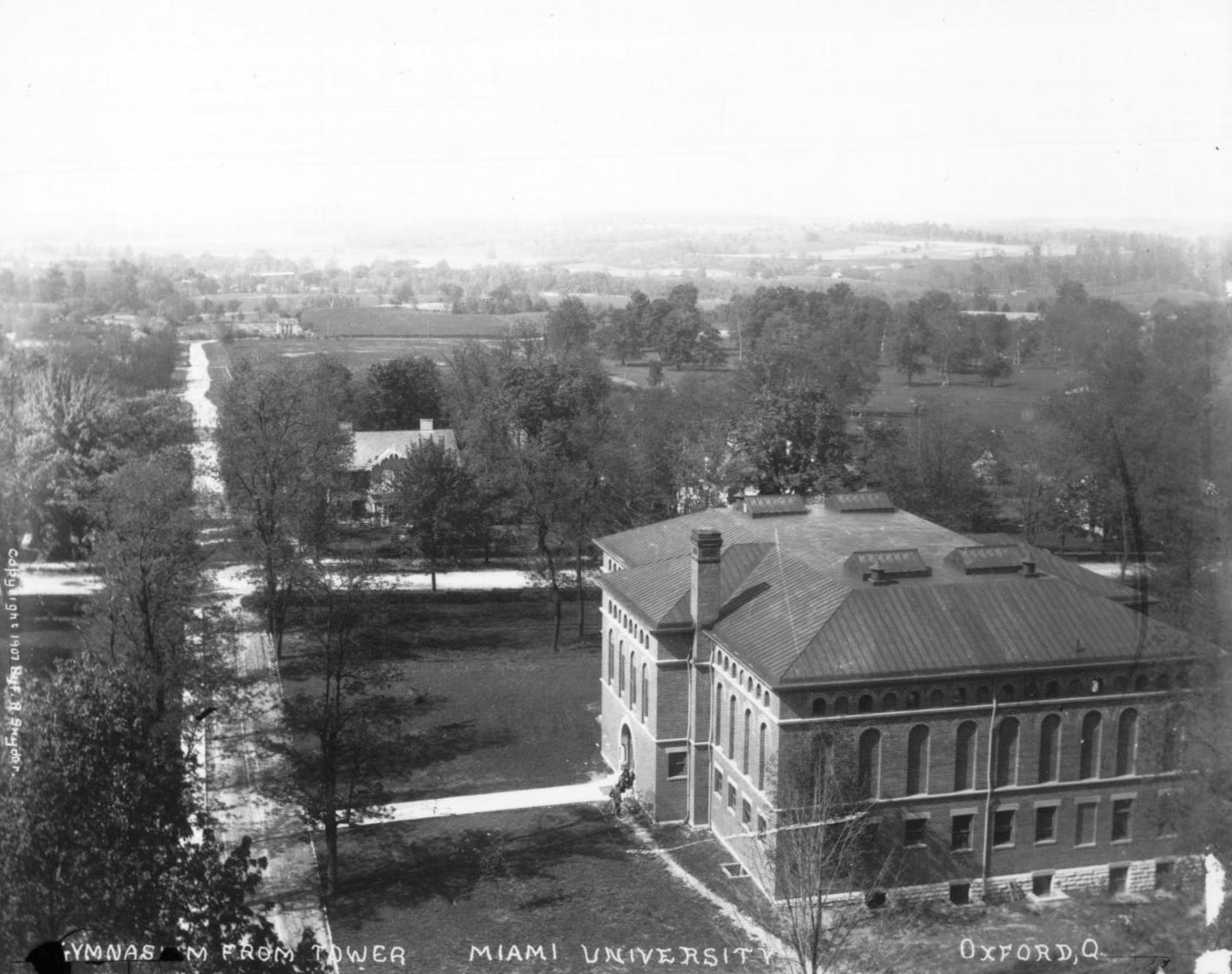
View of Herron from Old Main building
