= Samuel Laws =

American academic administrator (1824–1921)

The Reverend Samuel Laws
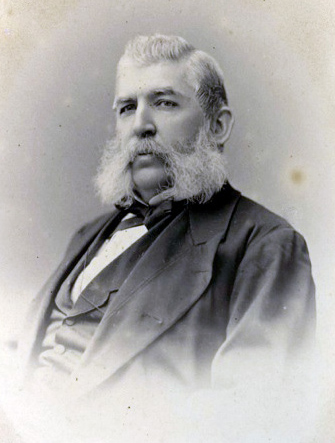

7th President of the University of Missouri
- In office 1876–1889
- Preceded by: Daniel Read
- Succeeded by: Richard Henry Jesse

1st President of Westminster College
- In office 1855–1861
- Preceded by: Office established
- Succeeded by: John Montgomery

Personal details
- Born: March 23, 1824 Ohio County, Virginia (present-day West Virginia), U.S.
- Died: January 9, 1921 (aged 96) Asheville, North Carolina, U.S.
- Resting place: Spring Grove Cemetery, Cincinnati, Ohio, U.S. 39°10′16.5″N 84°31′33.6″W
- Education: Miami University; Princeton Theological Seminary; Columbia University (LL.B.); Bellevue Hospital Medical College

Samuel Spahr Laws (March 23, 1824 – January 9, 1921) was an American minister, professor, physician, college president, businessman and inventor best known today as the inventor of the Laws Gold Indicator, a predecessor of the ticker tape machine. He was an 1848 graduate and class valedictorian of Miami University in Oxford, Ohio and a member of the Alpha chapter of Beta Theta Pi, founded nine years before his graduation in 1839.

== Life and career ==
=== Westminster College ===
Samuel Spahr Laws became a professor at Westminster College in 1854. At the college's first commencement in June 1855, the board of trustees elected Laws to the position of president of the college. Laws was officially confirmed to the position in October of that year. His term as president of Westminster was highly successful. He raised funds to establish an endowment that compared favorably with the more established east coast schools, and enrollment ranked fourth among all colleges of the Presbyterian Church. Laws had a dominating personality, and he did not tolerate well interference from other school officials. Laws came into conflict with the Westminster trustees over matters of discipline, and at the outbreak of the American Civil War in 1861 he was arrested and tried for treason after refusing to sign an oath of allegiance to the federal government. As a Virginia native, Laws was a southern sympathizer. He was removed from his position and jailed for three months in a St. Louis, Missouri prison, where he spent his time reading Aristotle. Laws was released on the condition that he leave the United States. He spent 1862 teaching in Paris, but in 1863 he returned to the United States and settled in New York.

=== New York Gold Exchange ===
In 1863, Laws returned to New York from Paris, and he found a job as manager of New York City's Gold Exchange and an amateur electrician, invented the gold indicator to put an end to the crush of messenger boys scurrying into the Exchange and back out to their clients with the latest gold price in hand. As the price of gold changed, an electrical signal sent from the trading floor would cause a hand on the device—a clocklike dial rimmed with numerals—to move until it pointed to the latest trading price.

Laws initially placed a gold indicator in a window at the Exchange, but he soon began installing them, through his newly founded Reporting Telegraph Co., in brokerage firms throughout Manhattan and pushing the latest prices of gold over the telegraph wires. Thus, as early as 1866, brokerage houses willing to pay the monthly fee could base trades on up-to-the-minute market information rather than waiting for runners to bring the news. In June 1869, Laws hired a penniless would-be inventor named Thomas A. Edison as mechanical supervisor.

=== University of Missouri ===
Laws served as president of the University of Missouri from 1876 to 1889. After he stepped down from the presidency in 1889, he moved to Kansas City, Missouri, where he continued to write books and manage his investments. In 1893 he accepted a teaching position in Columbia, South Carolina at the Presbyterian Theological Seminary, where he taught until his retirement in 1898. Following retirement from his teaching career, he lived in Richmond, Virginia, Washington, D.C., and finally Asheville, North Carolina where he died in 1921.

== Legacy ==
Miami University named the building that housed most of the Richard T. Farmer School of Business after Laws, and at the University of Missouri, residential building Laws Hall and Laws Observatory were also named in honor of him.

Academic offices
New office	President of Westminster College; 1855–1861	Succeeded by John Montgomery
Preceded by Daniel Read	President of the University of Missouri; 1876–1889	Succeeded by Richard Henry Jesse
