= Jenny Darroch =

Business academic in Miami

- Born: Auckland, New Zealand
- Education: University of Otago (Ph.D), University of Auckland (MCom)

Jenny Darroch is the Dean and Mitchell P. Rales Chair in Business Leadership of the Farmer School of Business at Miami University, former Henry Y. Hwang Dean of the Drucker School of Management at Claremont Graduate University, professor of marketing and entrepreneurship, and author. Her early scholarly work on innovation coincided with the appearance of the National Innovation System (NIS) in New Zealand.

Darroch served as a regular contributor to the HuffPost. Her articles examined a range of topics including skill sets for recent college graduates, Peter Drucker’s five key principles and the impact of Sustainable Development Goals on business practice.

== Biography ==
=== Education ===
Darroch received a Bachelor of Management Studies in Marketing and Economics at the University of Waikato in 1984, an honors degree in Economics at Massey University in 1998, and a Master of Commerce from the University of Auckland, New Zealand in 1992. She graduated from the University of Otago, New Zealand, with a Ph.D. in Marketing in 2002. Her thesis focused on innovation and knowledge management within national innovation systems. She held faculty appointments at New Zealand’s Massey University, University of Otago, and the University of Auckland before joining the Drucker School of Management at Claremont Graduate University in 2004. In March 2020, Darroch was named the dean of the Farmer School of Business at Miami University in Oxford, Ohio, effective July 1, 2020.

=== Academia ===
Darroch’s scholarship bridges marketing and innovation by investigating how firms harness knowledge and customer insights to shape consumer preferences and influence markets. Early in her career, she developed a methodology to assess New Zealand’s national innovation system (NIS). She co-edited a special issue of the Journal of the Academy of Marketing Science dedicated to Peter Drucker and has published extensively in peer-reviewed journals and practitioner outlets. Her work addresses how organizations translate market segmentation, consumer insight, and innovation strategy into sustainable business models.

Notable Works include Why Marketing to Women Doesn’t Work: Using Market Segmentation to Identify Customer Needs (2014), Marketing Through Turbulent Times (2010) – both published by Palgrave Macmillan.

=== Organizational involvement ===
Darroch has served on professional bodies and advisory boards, including the International Advisory Board at the University of Kent Business School. Darroch also volunteers for AACSB, serving on peer review teams and the Initial Accreditation Committee.

== Published works ==
- Why Marketing to Women Doesn’t Work: Using Market Segmentation to Identify Customer Needs (2014)
- Marketing Through Turbulent Times (2010)
- Innovation and Knowledge Management (2002)

== Awards ==
- 2014: Los Angeles Business Journal's Women Making A Difference "Rising Star" finalist
- 2010–2011: Claremont Graduate University Teacher of the Year (MBA)
