= Bob Darroch =

New Zealand illustrator and author

Bob Darroch (born 1940) is an illustrator, author and cartoonist from New Zealand. He writes and illustrates the popular Little Kiwi series of children's books (first published 2001), for which he received the Storylines Gaelyn Gordon Award in 2015. Darroch's cartoons have appeared in a number of newspapers, including the Whangarei Report, Hutt News, Napier Daily Telegraph, Christchurch Star and Timaru Herald. He has also illustrated two jigsaw puzzles.

In 2017, McDonald's New Zealand began offering one of his books as a part of the Happy Meal menu.

== Personal life ==
He started work for the Timaru Herald's advertising department in 1959 as his first job out of high school.

== Published works ==
Darroch has had many books published, these include:

- Time for Bed, Little Kiwi
- Little Kiwi and the Goodnight Sing-Song
- Little Kiwi and the Noisy Morning
- Little Kiwi Finds Fantail
- Little Kiwi Flies to the Rescue
- Little Kiwi Looks After the Egg
- Little Kiwi Counts the Chicks
- Little Kiwi has a Forest Feast
- Little Kiwi, Whose Nest is Best?
- Little Kiwi Meets a Monster
- Little Kiwi Loses his Mum
- Little Kiwi the Cool Mama
- Little Kiwi and the Dinosaur
- Little Kiwi is Scared of the Dark
