= Malcolm Darroch =

Scottish footballer

Personal information
- Full name: Malcolm Darroch
- Date of birth: 2 September 1938
- Place of birth: Camlachie, Scotland
- Date of death: 12 February 1985 (aged 46)
- Place of death: Glasgow, Scotland
- Position: Inside forward

Youth career
- Dalmarnock Congregational

Senior career*
Years	Team	Apps	(Gls)
1957–1959	Queen's Park	29	(8)
1959–1960	St Mirren	0	(0)

International career
1959	Scotland Amateurs	2	(0)
- * Club domestic league appearances and goals

Malcolm Darroch (2 September 1938 – 12 February 1985) was a Scottish amateur football inside forward who played in the Scottish League for Queen's Park. He was capped by Scotland at amateur level.
