= Jacqueline E. Darroch =

American reproductive health specialist

Jacqueline Eileen Darroch is an American specialist of reproductive health. She is currently a senior fellow at the Guttmacher Institute, with which she has been involved since 1978.

== Biography ==
Darroch received her B.A. from Barnard College, her M.A. in sociology from the University of Michigan, and PhD from Princeton University. She also studied at the University of Cologne on a Fulbright fellowship.

Darroch began working for the Guttmacher Institute in 1978 as Director of Research, focusing on the reproductive needs of women in the United States. In 1988, she was promoted to Vice President of Research, and, in 2002, to Vice President of Science. In 2004, she left Guttmacher to become associate director for Reproductive Health at the Bill & Melinda Gates Foundation in Seattle, before returning to the institute as Senior Fellow, a position she has held ever since. Her research has led her to use data science to outline the inequalities in global reproductive health and offer policy recommendations to improve reproductive rights in disadvantaged communities. Her report on global reproductive inequality has estimated that around 225 million women in developing countries do not have access to contraceptives, 54 million women do not attend the minimum number of prenatal visits as recommended by the World Health Organization, and 44 million women deliver babies outside a reproductive health facility.

In 1995, Darroch was elected a member of the Institute Of Medicine of the National Academy of Sciences.
