= Laws Hall (Miami University) =

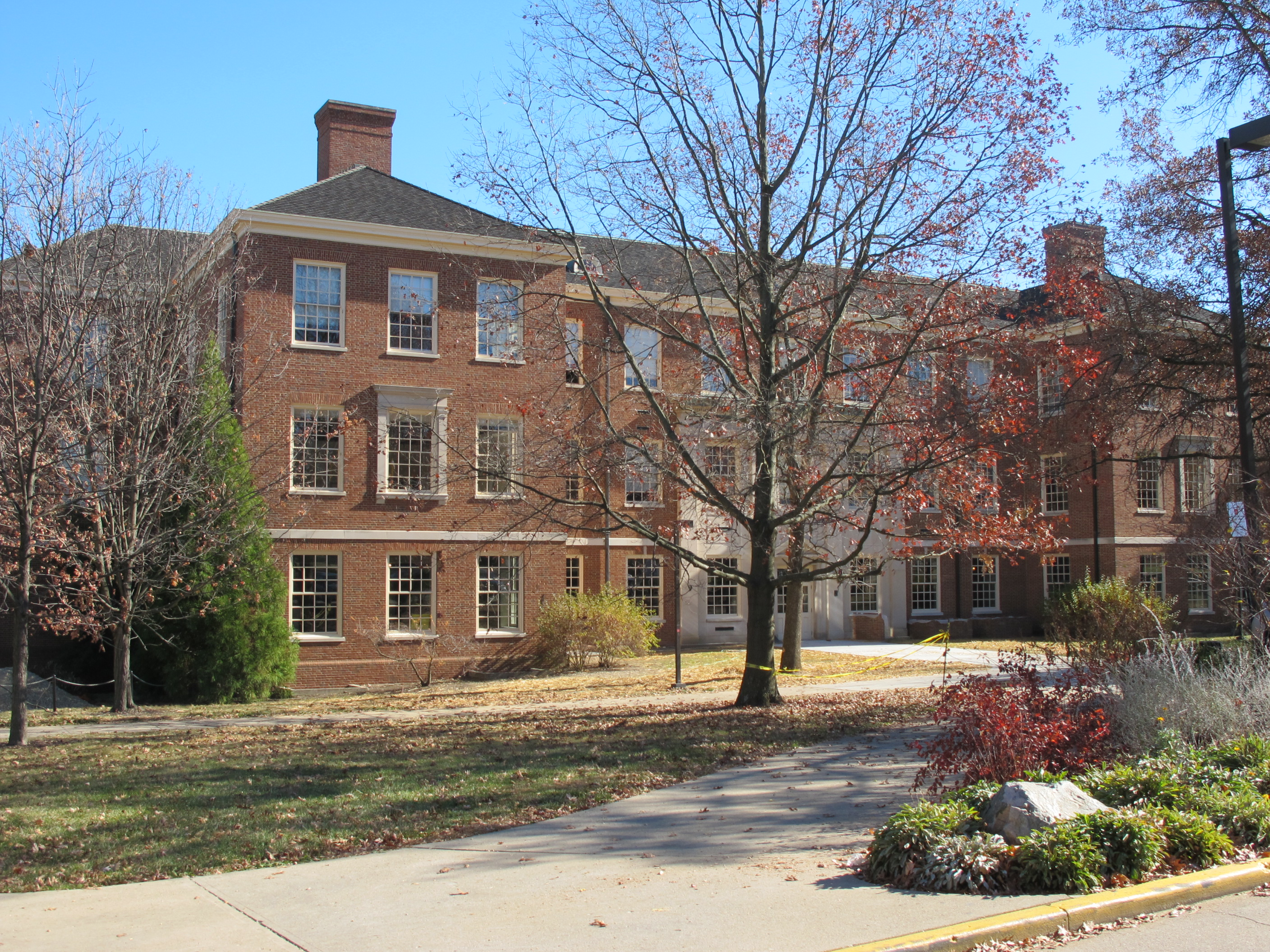
- Front of Laws Hall
- Interactive map of the Laws Hall area
- Former names: Business Administration Building

General information
- Type: Academic
- Location: 551 East High Street; Oxford, Ohio, United States
- Coordinates: 39°30′34.91″N 84°43′59.43″W
- Completed: September 1959
- Inaugurated: October 1959
- Renovated: August 2011
- Cost: $1,701,000
- Owner: Miami University

Technical details
- Floor area: 69,454 sq ft (6,452.5 m^{2})

Design and construction
- Architects: Cellarius & Hilmer

Laws Hall is a building at Miami University. Until 2009, the building was home to the School of Business Administration, hosting classes of accountancy, finance, economics, management, supply chain and marketing. The building is under construction and is being renovated to become a library for multiple schools at Miami University. Miami often renovates buildings after 40 years, which is one of the many reasons Laws Hall is under construction. The introduction of the Farmer School of Business made Laws Hall obsolete for the business school, and its purpose is being changed and discussed.

== History ==
In September 1959, the building, which was called Laws Hall after the dedication in October, was built. The School of Business Administration was one of the most elite in the country at the time, and was one of the earliest introduced, compared to other similar schools. Students would study the fundamentals of business within Laws Hall. It was one of the biggest and most advanced buildings on campus at the time it was built. The building cost $1,701,000 when it was built 1959. The general contractor for the build was Knowlton Construction. The gross square footage of the building is 69,454 and was one of the largest academic buildings on Miami's campus when it was first opened. Laws Hall was the meeting place for many student associations and business meetings. The building's second floor was intended and designed for large conferences for the respected officers of the university to make important decisions affecting the school. Procter & Gamble donates large amounts annually to the school. As the school for Business Administration, P&G helped fund the construction, which in turn led the university to dedicate the second floor east hallway to the company.

== Samuel Spahr Laws (1824–1921) ==
The Business Administration building was dedicated on October 9, 1959 after Samuel Spahr Laws, class of 1848. An employer of Thomas A. Edison, inventor of the stock market ticker, minister, lawyer, physician, financier, vice president and manager of the New York Gold Exchange, and college president of the University of Missouri. He was named as one of the most illustrious graduates of Miami University, whose worldly impact was to never be forgotten on Miami's grounds through the dedication of "Laws Hall." Because Laws Hall was built to house the School of Business Administration, this selection seemed fitting.

== Future ==
In 1999, the steering committee determined that the School of Business would no longer function in Laws Hall and Upham Hall and potential sites were researched and studied. The university sought for the School of Business to be housed in one building to improve programs, student services and effective communication. The new instructional spaces will reflect a shift toward small-group work, seminar instruction, and experiential learning.

Ted Christian, the Laws Hall project manager said "Laws Hall is currently going through rehabilitation. Because the building was built in 1959, Miami University tries to rehabilitate the building about every 40 years to make sure they're current and energy efficient."

When the project is finished, the bottom two floors of Laws Hall will be a library for science, business, engineering and psychology. It is projected that this project will be complete next fall. The inside of Laws Hall will be updated with new flooring, new paint and new furniture. The school stated that because of the small sizes of new classes and more offerings of different times for classes, some business might still be hosted in Laws Hall.
