= Ogden Hall (Miami University) =

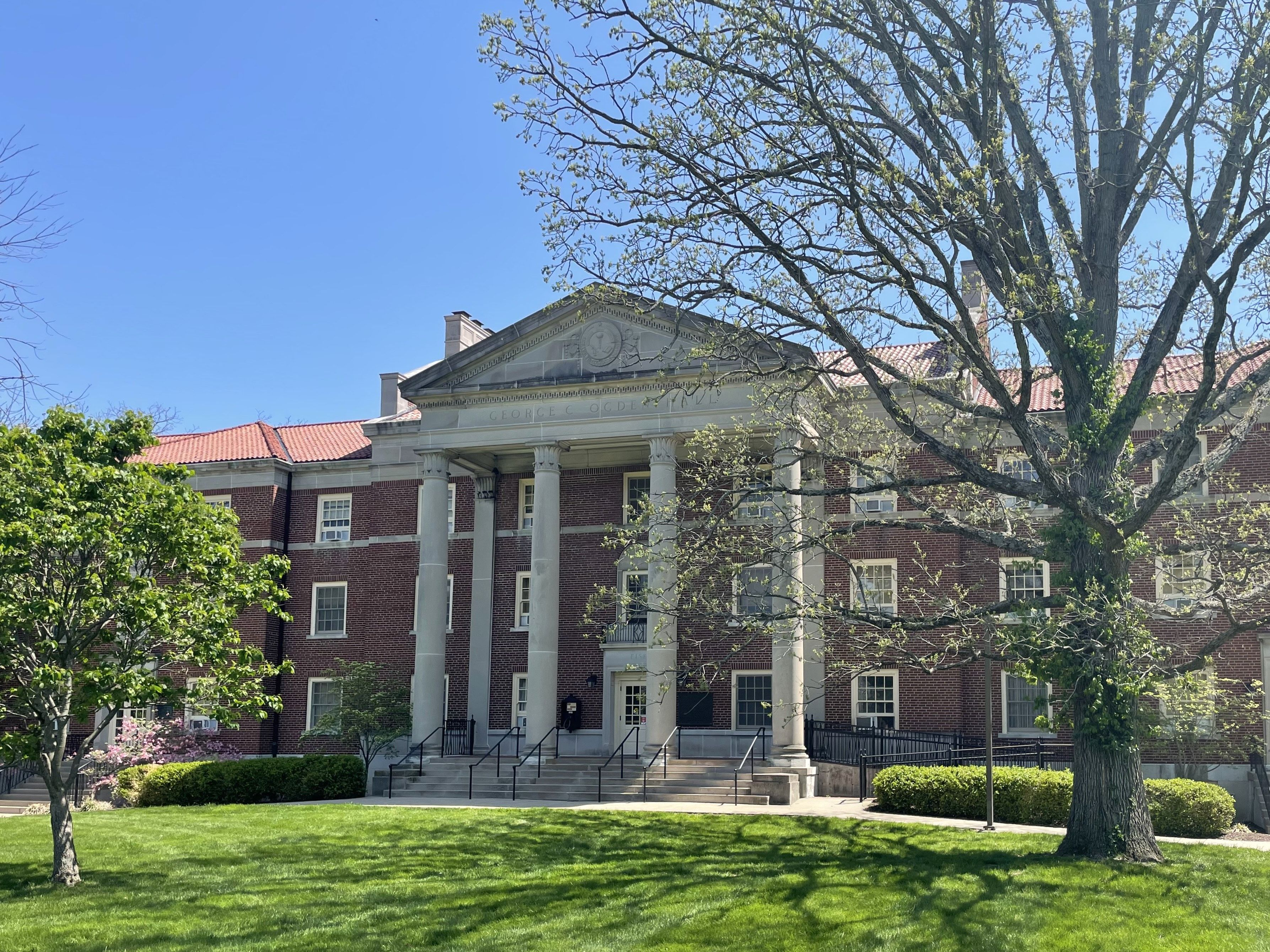
- Ogden Hall at Miami University in 2022.
- Interactive map of Ogden Hall

General information
- Type: Residential Hall, Dining Hall
- Architectural style: Colonial
- Location: Miami University, 401 East High Street Oxford, OH 45056
- Coordinates: 39°30′34.94″N 84°44′8.65″W
- Current tenants: Male and female sophomores
- Completed: 1924
- Renovated: 1999
- Cost: $300,000.00
- Renovation cost: $6,103,444.00
- Owner: Miami University

Technical details
- Floor area: 52,700 sq ft

Design and construction
- Architecture firm: Dittoe, Fahnestock & Ferber
- Main contractor: Fred Wood

Renovating team
- Renovating firm: GBBN Architects
- Main contractor: Wright Seyferth

Ogden Hall is a hall of residence of Miami University. Construction started in 1923, funded by a donation from Laura Ogden Whaling. The building was renovated and extended in 1999. Originally it was a residence for male students, but now serves as a dining hall and residence for both male and female students.

== History ==
In 1923 Laura Ogden Whaling donated $430,000 to Miami University to build a hall of residence in her brother's honor. Her brother, George C. Ogden, graduated from Miami in 1863 and went on to receive his medical degree from the Ohio Medical College. It was part of her request that the Hall must be located west of the Herron Gym, directly across the street from Lewis Place, the President's home. But the president did not want a building directly across from Lewis Place; he wanted green space on either side of the slant walk. So in order to keep with Laura Ogden Whaling's wishes, Herron Gym was moved down the street to what is now the parking lot adjacent to Roudebush Hall.

The cornerstone of Ogden Hall was laid on October 12, 1923. The stone was laid by the Grand Master of the Masonic Lodge in Ohio, Mr. Harry S. Johnson, of Cincinnati. He was assisted by President Hughes, members of the Board of Trustees, and other University officials. Ogden Hall was the first men's dormitory built on campus since the North and South Dorms were built. It also provided for a place for social activities, as it had a men's auditorium, Y.M.C.A. quarters, game rooms, and a number of conference rooms, in addition to housing 114 men.

Ogden Hall was designed by Dittoe, Fahnestock & Ferber Architects and cost $330,000.00 to build in 1924. The general contractor was Fred Wood (Physical Facilities - Ogden Hall). It was to be a three-story red brick, stone trimmed, red tile roof Colonial building, which fit in with the rest of the architecture on campus (Ogden Hall Corner Stone to be Laid).

== Rumors and ghost stories ==
=== The Ogden Hall Wall ===
The rumor is that when Laura Ogden Whaling donated money to Miami University, in order to build a new men's dormitory in her brother's name, she made a demand that a wall should be constructed around the new structure to keep it private. After the dormitory was built, it was rumored that Miami did indeed build the wall, but underground. The rumored wall was actually the foundation of the old Miami gymnasium. The gymnasium had to be moved during the construction of Ogden Hall because of the location wanted by Laura Ogden Whaling for the dormitory. Currently there is a tradition that the “wall” was built to keep men out of what would become a women's residence hall.

== Present: recent renovation ==
In 1999, the building undertook renovations to update the building to then current accessibility and building code standards and to update the dinner facility. At “Miami Spice” students are able to participate in the production of their meals, choosing ingredients and passing them directly to the cook. Also with this addition came the expanding of seating and a new outdoor plaza café.

Cincinnati-based architects, GBBN, carried out the renovations. GBBN Architects did 14,000 sq ft (1,300 m^{2}). of renovation and a 7,000 sq ft (650 m^{2}). addition to Ogden Hall. They created 9 food stations, 4 themed interior dining areas, a formal dining area, and an outdoor café (Ogden Hall). This new addition cost $6,103,444.00 and the projects contractor was Wright Seyferth. The building is currently used as a dining hall and a residence hall for freshman students.
