= Laws Observatory =

Observatory in Missouri, US

- Organization: University of Missouri
- Location: 5th Floor, Physics Building, Columbia, Missouri, United States
- Coordinates: 38.9438°N 92.3228°W
- Established: 1853
- Website: cmaa.missouri.edu

Laws Observatory is the name of three separate astronomical observatories owned and operated by University of Missouri since 1880. Named after former University President Samuel Laws, it is located in Columbia, Missouri (USA).

== History ==
The University of Missouri Observatory was originally built in 1853 near Academic Hall. The original site is now occupied by the Engineering East building. The observatory was equipped with a 4 1/16 inch Henry Fitz refractor, and it was the first observatory in the western United States.

In 1879, MU offered $500 cash and the Fitz telescope in exchange for a 7½ inch Munich-built equatorial refractor by Merz and Soehne from the failing Shelby College in Shelbyville, Kentucky. Shelby College agreed to the exchange, but MU found that it could not afford the transportation and reassembly of the Merz and Soehne telescope along with an adequate facility to house it. University President Samuel S. Laws stepped in and provided $2,000 of his own money to transport the telescope and begin construction of a new observatory. When the new observatory was constructed, the part that constituted the cone, clock room, and transit room were actually part of the original observatory, and those parts were moved to the new location for the construction of the new Laws Observatory on the north side of the Quadrangle in 1880. An office was added to the building in 1891, and classroom space was added in 1907. An R. Brown Gans-built 4½ inch equatorial refractor was also added to the observatory in 1907. In 1912, a 5-inch Brashear photographic doublet was mounted on the 7½ inch Merz. The observatory was torn down in 1919 to make way for construction of Neff Hall.

In 1920, the observatory was rebuilt on its third location, which is now the site of the west parking lot of the Harry S. Truman Veterans Hospital.

== See also ==
- List of observatories
