= Porta del Sol =

Tourism region in western Puerto Rico

Porta del Sol Western Region
- Tourism Region
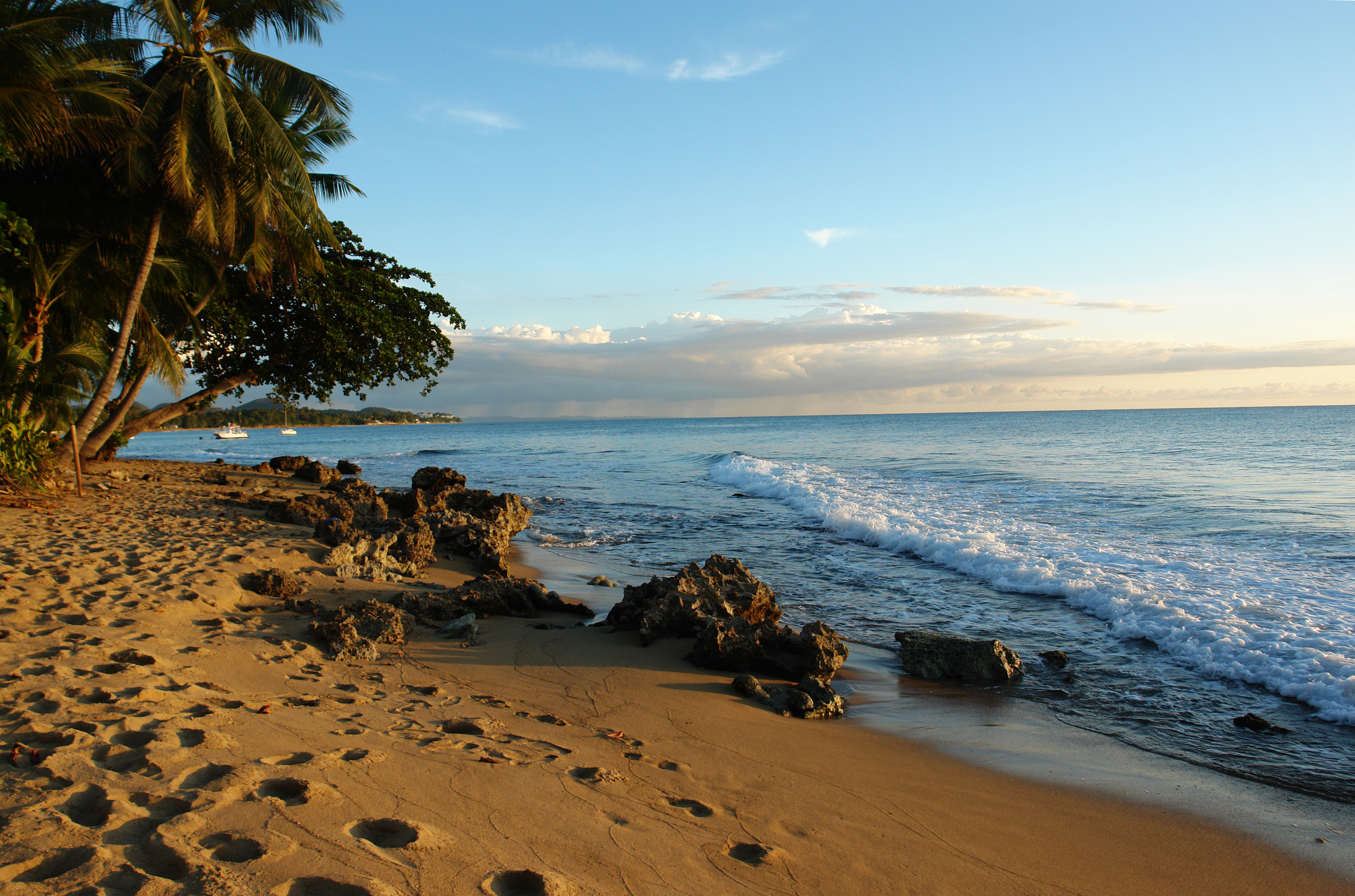
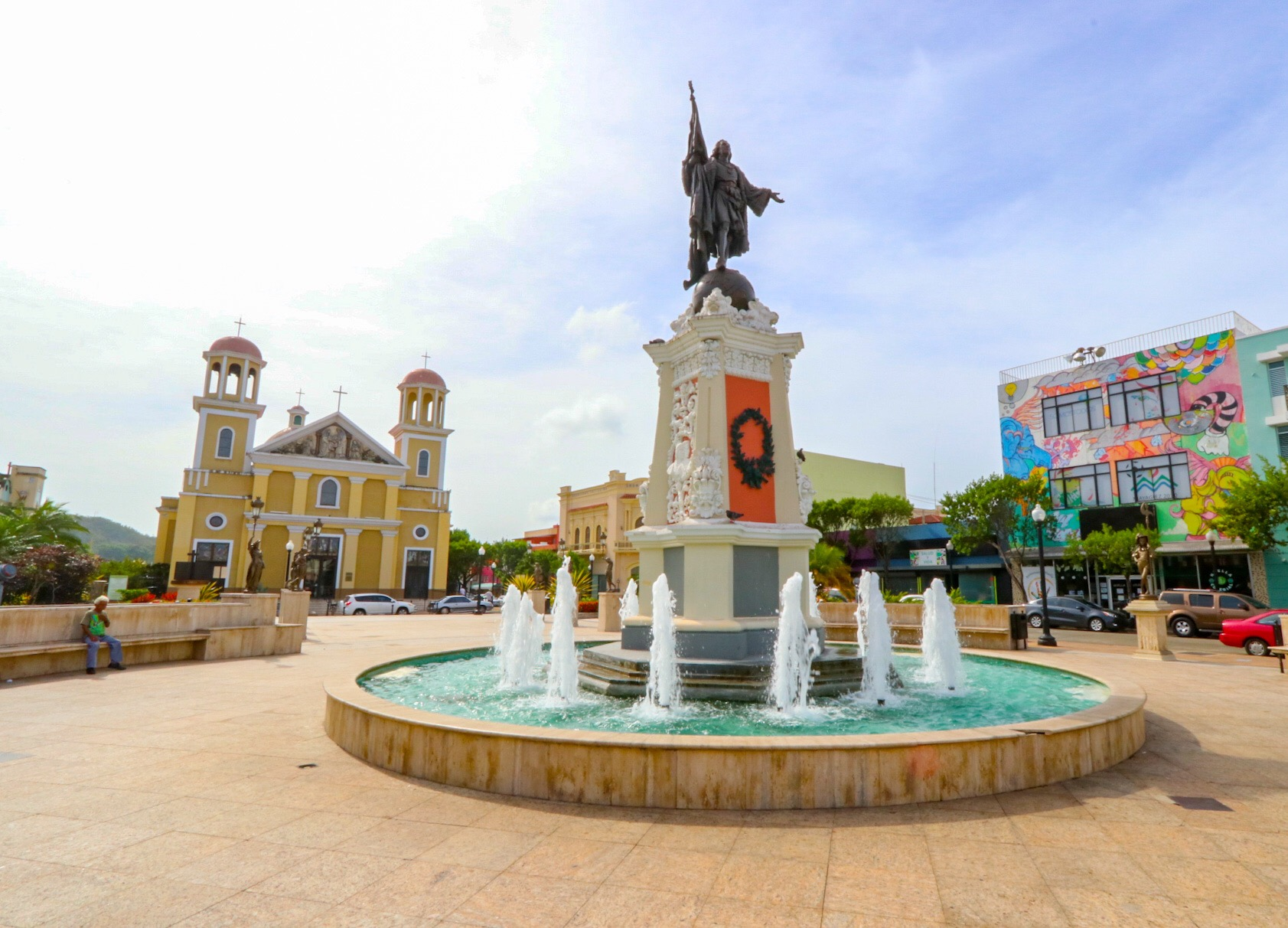
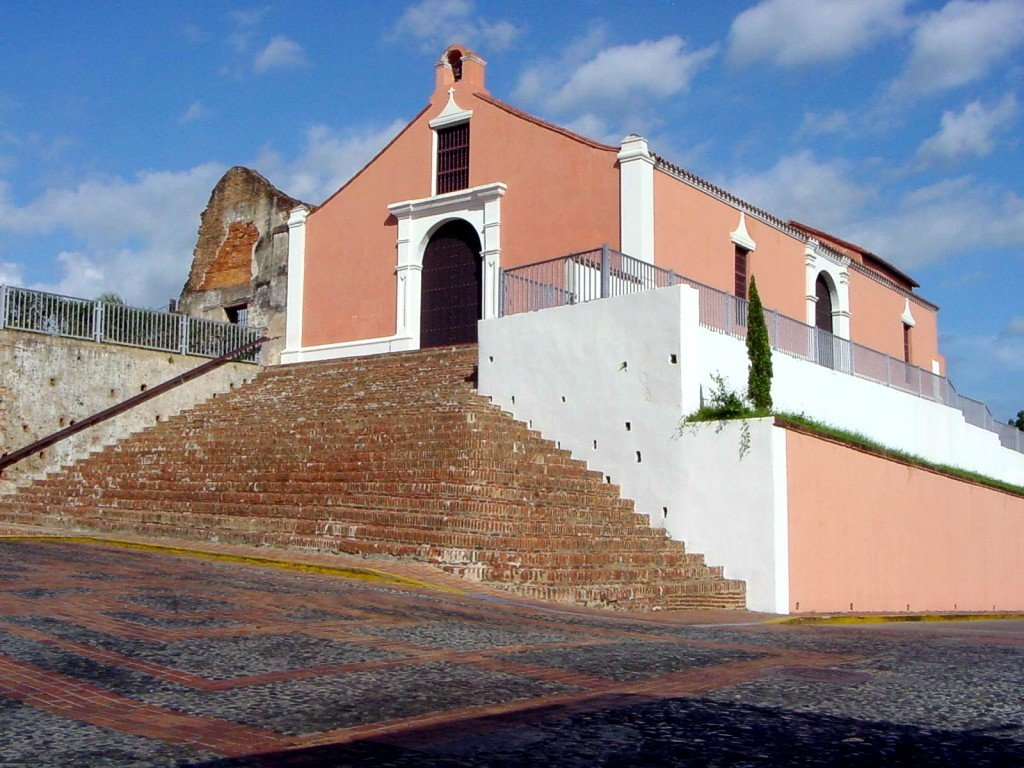
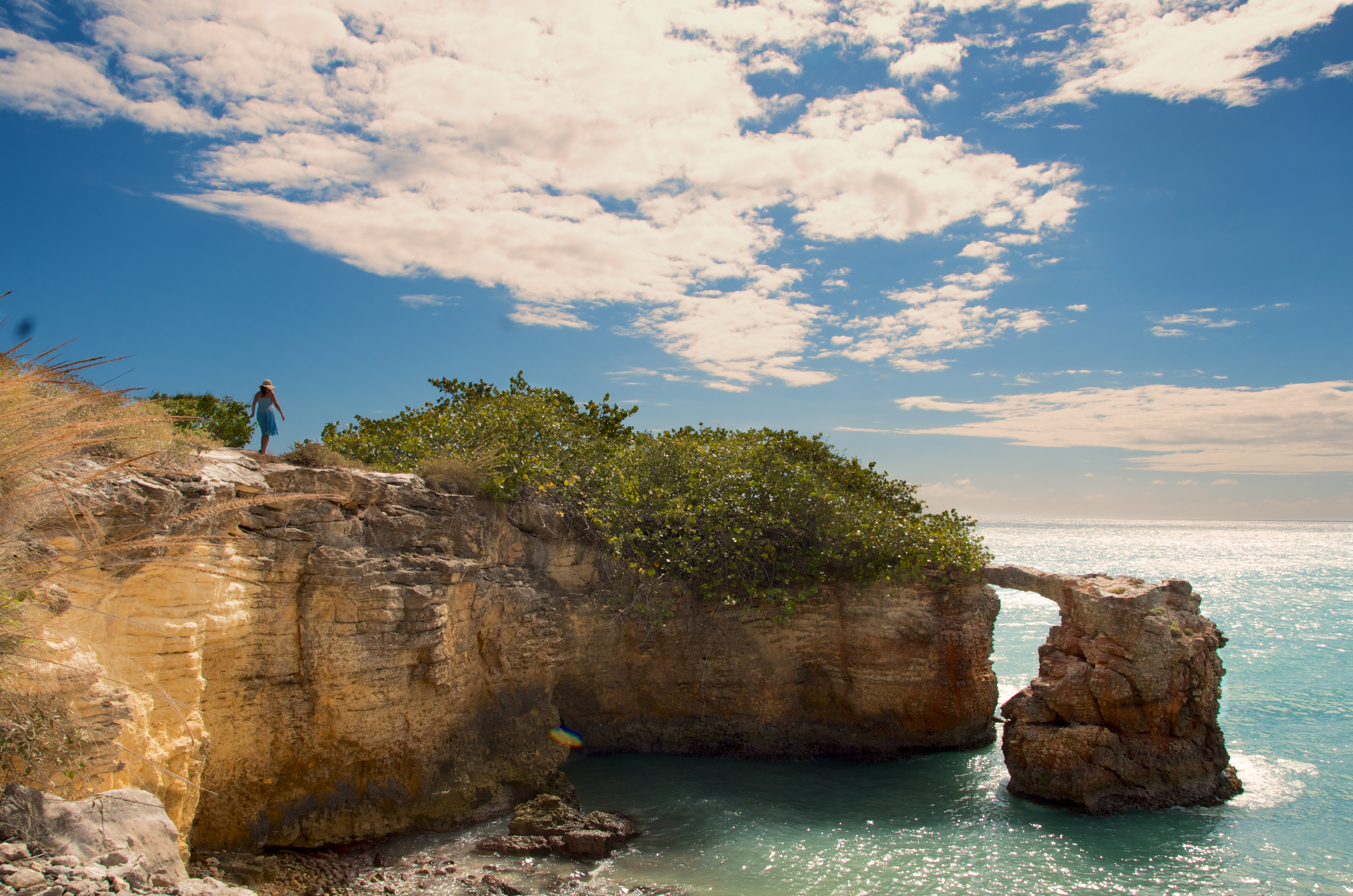
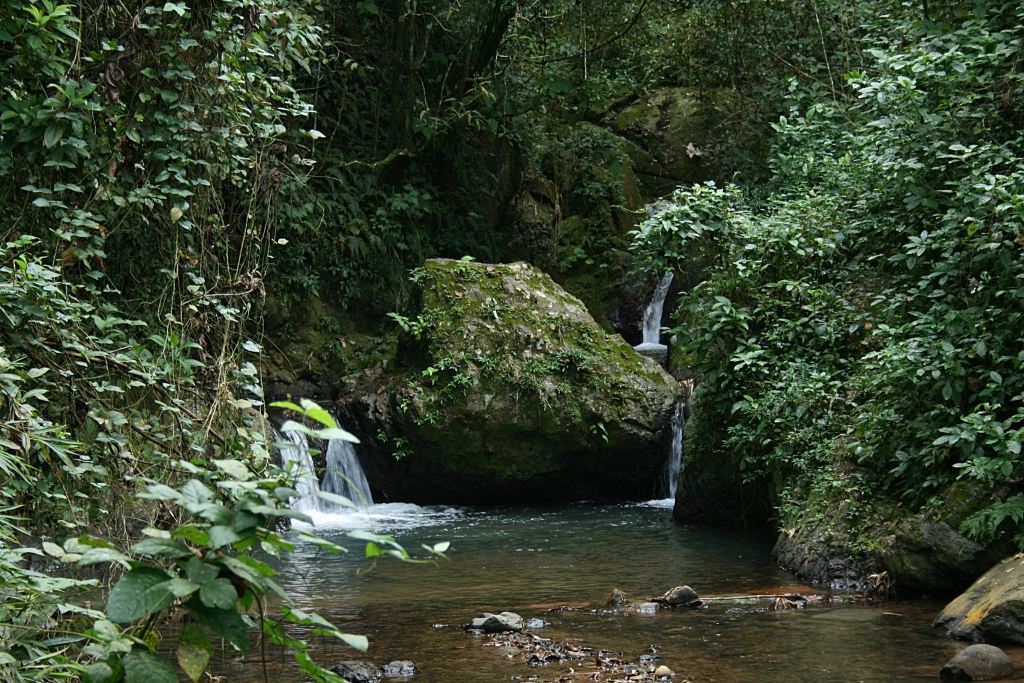
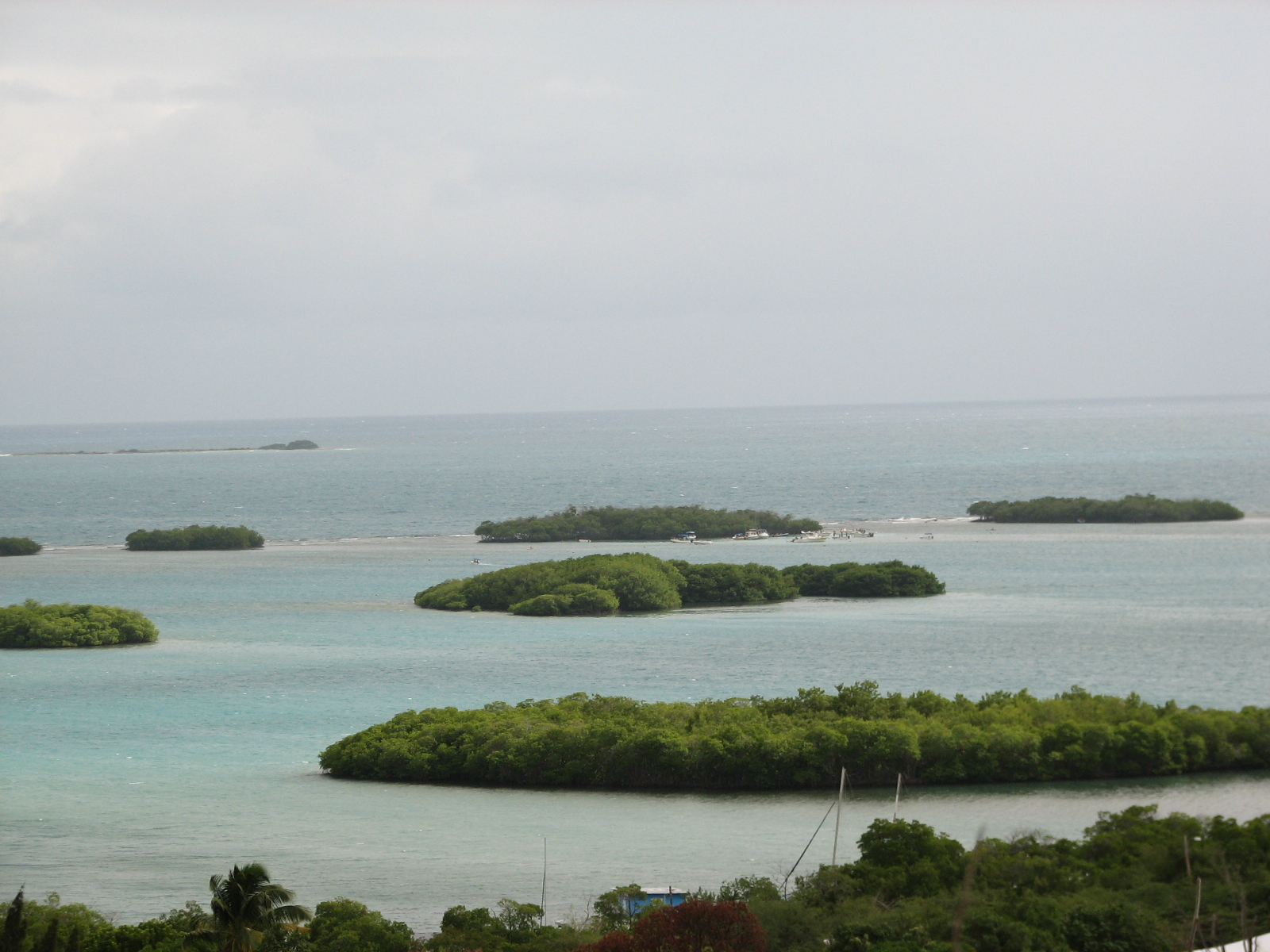
- Rincón Mayagüez San Germán Cabo Rojo Maricao La Parguera

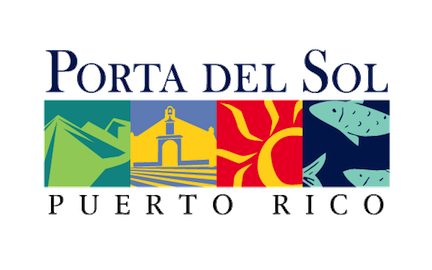
- Seal
- Nickname: Doorway to the Sun
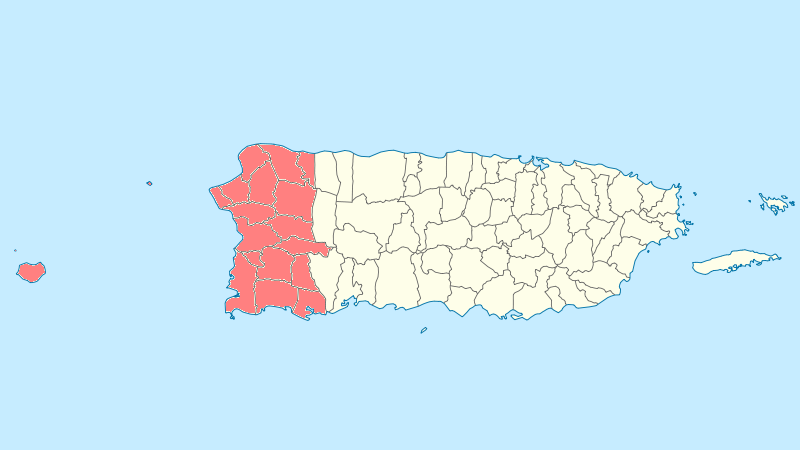
- Municipalities officially belonging to the Porta del Sol region.
- Country: United States
- Unincorporated territory: Puerto Rico
- Established: 2003
- Founder: Puerto Rico Tourism Company

Area
  - Total: 1,278.26 sq mi (3,310.7 km^{2})
  - Land: 831.94 sq mi (2,154.7 km^{2})
  - Water: 446.32 sq mi (1,156.0 km^{2})

Population
  - Total: 517,905
  - Density: 622.482/sq mi (240.342/km^{2})
- Time zone: AST

Porta del Sol (Spanish for "Doorway of the Sun"), or simply West Region (Región Oeste), is a tourism region in western Puerto Rico. Porta del Sol was the first tourism region to be established by the Puerto Rico Tourism Company. It consists of 17 municipalities in the western area: Quebradillas, Isabela, San Sebastián, Moca, Aguadilla, Aguada, Rincón, Añasco, Mayagüez, Las Marías, Maricao, Hormigueros, San Germán, Sabana Grande, Guánica, Lajas and Cabo Rojo.

== History ==
The Porta del Sol tourism region was designated in 2003 and officially launched on December 20, 2005, by the Puerto Rico Tourism Company by decree of Law No. 158. The name of the region, Porta del Sol, references both the historic church of Porta Coeli (Latin for "gateway" or "doorway to heaven") and the famous scenic sunsets that can be seen along the western coast of Puerto Rico. The name Porta was later adapted into the names of other tourism regions of the island such as Porta Caribe and Porta Cordillera.

Before the official establishment of the tourism region, towns such as Rincón and Aguadilla attracted many Puerto Rican visitors. Paradores, small historic inns or bed and breakfasts, were established by the government of Luis A. Ferré in 1973 in order to boost the tourism industry of Puerto Rico outside of San Juan. Many paradores opened in the region since then, such as Parador Villa Parguera which was founded by comedian Henry LaFont (Julio Pancorbo Ortiz). The fishing village of La Parguera has become a popular tourist attraction due to its seafood and opportunities for boating, and for its proximity to natural attractions such as Bahía Fosforescente, a bay with bioluminescence caused by the dinoflagellate Pyrodinium bahamense, one of the seven year-round bioluminescent bays in the Caribbean (and the only one of three in Puerto Rico in which visitors are allowed to swim).

Porta del Sol has also developed into a world-class destination for surfing. Since 2000, Rafael Hernández Airport (BQN) has expanded its passenger service into and from destinations such as New York, Newark, Orlando and Tampa, making Porta del Sol more accessible to visitors from outside of Puerto Rico, and it was designated a "free trade zone" (FTZ) on February 20, 2012 by the United States Department of Commerce.

Porta del Sol was affected by Hurricane Maria in 2017. The tourism of the region was also greatly affected by the 2019–2020 Puerto Rico earthquakes, particularly the January 7 earthquake measuring 6.4 M_{w} with an epicenter in the municipality of Guánica. These earthquakes destroyed important tourist attractions such as the Punta Ventana natural arch in the municipality of Guayanilla, in addition to causing up to $3.1 billion in damages across southwestern Puerto Rico, greatly affecting the infrastructure in the tourism regions of Porta del Sol and Porta Caribe.

Dr. Juan A. Rivero Zoo of Puerto Rico (Zoológico de Puerto Rico Dr. Juan A. Rivero), commonly known as Mayagüez Zoo (Zoológico de Mayagüez) and operated by the Puerto Rico Department of Natural and Environmental Resources (DRNA), used to be the largest and only zoo of its type in Puerto Rico until its closure in the aftermath of Hurricane Maria in 2017. The zoo had previously been cited for its inhumane treatment of animals, which was one of the reasons its federal permits were revoked by the U.S. Department of Agriculture and was consequently permanently closed in 2023 by the U.S. Department of Justice. All species were relocated to animal sanctuaries across the United States, and the site of the zoo remains unused but still owned by the DRNA.

== Attractions ==
=== Beaches and swimming ===
- Ballenas
- Boquerón
- Buyé
- Caña Gorda
- Cayo Ratones
- Cayos de Caña Gorda
- Crash Boat
- Domes
- El Combate
- Espinar
- Gozalandia
- Guajataca
- Isla Mata la Gata
- Jobos
- La Jungla
- La Parguera
- Las Golondrinas
- Little Malibu
- Middles
- Pico Piedra
- Puerto Hermina
- Punta Borinquen
- Rincón
- Shacks (Bajura)
- Steps (Tres Palmas)
- Sucia
- Tres Hermanos

=== Ecotourism ===
- Cabo Rojo, Desecheo and Laguna Cartagena National Wildlife Refuges, part of the Caribbean Islands National Wildlife Refuge complex
- Boquerón State Forest
- Guajataca State Forest
- Guánica State Forest
- Maricao State Forest
- Susúa State Forest
- Tres Palmas Marine Reserve
- Joyuda Lagoon Nature Reserve
- La Parguera Nature Reserve with Bahía Fosforescente
- Mona and Monito Islands Nature Reserve
- Punta Ballenas Nature Reserve
- Tourmaline Reef Nature Reserve
- Boquerón Iris Alameda Wildlife Refuge
- Lake Guajataca Wildlife Refuge

=== Heritage Tourism ===
==== Agritourism ====
- Central Guánica
- Coloso Valley Agricultural Reserve
- Hacienda Buena Unión
- Hacienda Iruena
- Hacienda Juanita
- Hacienda La Enriqueta
- Hacienda San Francisco
- Lajas Valley Agricultural Reserve

==== Archaeological sites ====
- Delfín del Yagüez Archaeological Park

==== Culinary tourism ====
- Brazos gitanos in Mayagüez
- India Brewery
- Rex Cream's Ice Cream
- Seafood in the fishing villages (villas pesqueras) and fisheries (pescaderías) of Boquerón, Joyuda and La Parguera

==== Cultural and historical landmarks ====
- Caprón Fortress
- El Parterre (Ojo de Agua)
- Guajataca Tunnel
- Hermitage of San Antonio de Padua de la Tuna
- Israel "Shorty" Castro Coastal Park
- La Cara del Indio
- Malecón de Guánica with the Guánica Rock
- Maricao Fish Hatchery
- Old Sugar Pier of Aguadilla
- Parque Cristóbal Colón
- Parque de los Próceres
- Pozo de Jacinto

==== Historic districts ====
- Aguadilla Pueblo
- Mayagüez Pueblo
- Sabana Grande Pueblo
- San Germán Historic District

==== Lighthouses ====
- Guánica
- Los Morrillos de Cabo Rojo
- Mona Island
- Punta Borinquen
- Punta Higuero

==== Museums ====
- Baudilio Vega Berrios Cultural Center
- Cacique Mabodamaca House of Culture
- Enrique Laguerre House Museum
- Eugenio María de Hostos Museum
- Isabela Museum of Photography
- José de Diego Manor House Museum
- La Botica Pharmacy Museum in San Germán
- Lola Rodríguez de Tió Museum
- Museum of Art and History of Guánica
- Museum of Art of Aguadilla and the Caribbean
- Museum of Mundillo
- Museum of Religious Art of Puerto Rico
- Palacete Los Moreau
- Railway Museum of Isabela
- Ramírez de Arrellano y Rossell House Museum
- RUM Planetarium
- San Germán History Museum

==== Religious tourism ====
- Basilica of the Virgin of Monserrat
- Church of San Carlos Borromeo of Aguadilla
- Church of San Francisco de Asís of Aguada
- Church of San Germán Auxerre of San Germán
- Church of San Isidro Labrador and Santa María de la Cabeza of Sabana Grande
- Church of Saint Sebastian the Martyr
- Porta Coeli

==== Theaters and event venues ====
- Sol Theater
- Yagüez Theater

=== Tourist routes ===
The Luis Muñoz Marín Panoramic Route (Ruta Panorámica Luis Muñoz Marín), or simply known as Ruta Panorámica, is a scenic route and heritage trail that crosses the mountainous area of Porta del Sol from west to east. Although more often associated with the Porta Cordillera region, the route traverses the Porta del Sol municipalities of Mayagüez, Las Marías, Maricao, San Germán and Sabana Grande. The route, consisting of a network of at least 40 secondary roads, traverses the entirety of Puerto Rico from east (Maunabo) to west (Mayagüez) and provides access to a number of tourist attractions located throughout Porta del Sol such as the Maricao State Forest.

The Porta del Sol Sagrado tourist route (Spanish for "Sacred Doorway to the Sun") is a theme route and heritage trail created by the Puerto Rico Tourism Company in collaboration with the Pontifical Catholic University of Puerto Rico in 2016 to advertise the cultural and historic religious heritage of the region. The heritage trail follows a driving route centered on the landmarks of Porta Coeli in the San Germán Historic District, the Central Presbyterian Church of Mayagüez and the Ermita de Espinar in Aguada. This was the third religious heritage trail created by the government of Puerto Rico after the Carlos Manuel Rodríguez Route in Caguas and the San Juan Bautista Route in Old San Juan.

The Puerto Rico Alien Route (Ruta Extraterrestre de Puerto Rico) is a municipal tourist route located on a section of PR-303 in the municipality of Lajas due to the high number of UFO sightings in the area. The route was officially proclaimed by Marcos “Turín” Irizarry Pagán, mayor of Lajas, on April 9, 2005. and an unofficial sign marking the start of the route was installed by farmer Francisco Negrón and it remains a popular cultural landmark of the area.

== Transportation ==
Two airports with commercial service connect the area to other cities in Puerto Rico and the world, these being Rafael Hernandez Airport (BQN) in Aguadilla with services on five passenger airlines from Florida and the New York metropolitan area as well as some cargo airlines, and Eugenio Maria de Hostos Airport (MAZ) in Mayagüez, with local flights to San Juan.

== See also ==
- National Register of Historic Places listings in Porta del Sol
- Beaches of Porta de Sol
