= Triathlon at the 2010 Central American and Caribbean Games =

Held in Mayagüez, Puerto Rico

- Venue: Balneario de Rincón
- Location: Mayagüez
- Dates: 24-25 July

The Triathlon competition at the 2010 Central American and Caribbean Games was held in Mayagüez, Puerto Rico.

The tournament was scheduled to be held from 24–25 July at the Balneario de Rincón at Porta del Sol.

== Medal summary ==
=== Men's events ===
Event	Gold	Silver	Bronze
Olympic distance	Francisco Serrano (MEX)	Crisanto Grajales (MEX)	Tyler Butterfield (BER)

=== Women's events ===
Event	Gold	Silver	Bronze
Olympic distance	Claudia Rivas (MEX)	Flora Duffy (BER)	Fiorella D'Croz (COL)

=== Team events ===
Event	Gold	Silver	Bronze
Men's Olympic distance	Mexico	Costa Rica	Guatemala
Women's Olympic distance	Mexico	Colombia	Puerto Rico
4xmixed relays	Mexico	Colombia	Costa Rica
