= List of beaches in Puerto Rico =

Some sources state there are close to 300 beaches in Puerto Rico, while other sources count up to 1,200. Whatever the number, the Government of Puerto Rico officially recognized 248 of them. In Puerto Rico there are 78 municipalities of which 44 have a coastline.

– Indicates a Blue Flag beach
– Indicates camping area
– Indicates diving or snorkeling area
– Indicates scuba area
– Indicates surfing area
– Indicates lifeguards posted
– Indicates fishing area
– Indicates swimming area

== Eastern region beaches ==
=== Luquillo ===
- Luquillo Beach "La Monserrate",
  - Mar Sin Barreras (Wheelchair accessible section of "La Monserrate" Beach)
- Surfing Beach "La Pared"
- Playa Azul Beach

=== Culebra ===
- Flamenco Beach
- Brava Beach
- Larga Beach
- Carlos Rosario Beach
- Luis Peña Beach
- Punta Soldado Beach
- Resaca Beach
- Zoni Beach
- Tortuga Beach
- Tamarindo Beach
- Sirena Beach

=== Vieques ===
- Sun Bay Beach
- Playa Negrita (Black Sand Beach)
- Barracuda (García) Beach
- Caracas (Red) Beach
- Esperanza Beach
- Gallito Beach
- Playa Grande Beach
- La Chiva (Blue) Beach
- La Plata Beach
- Media Luna Beach
- Navio Beach
- Tapón (Hidden) Beach
- Punta Arenas Beach
- Natural Reserve Mosquito Bay
- Rompeolas (Mosquito Pier)
- Playuela Beach

=== Maunabo ===
- Los Pinos
- Los Bohios Beach
- Punta Tuna Beach
- Larga Beach

=== Naguabo ===
- Tropical Beach
- Húcares Beach

=== Yabucoa ===
- Lucia Beach
- Guayanes Beach
- El Negro Beach
- Posita del Piojo

=== Others ===
- Seven Seas Beach, Las Croabas, Fajardo
- Punta Santiago Beach, Humacao

== Northern region beaches ==
=== Dorado ===
- Sardinera Beach
- Ritz-Carlton Reserve

=== Toa Baja ===
- Isla de Cabras Beach
- Punta Salinas Beach

=== Carolina ===
- Carolina Beach
- Isla Verde Beach

=== Loiza ===
- Vacia Talega Beach
- Piñones Beach
- Aviones Beach

=== Piñones ===
- Aviones Beach
- Posita Beach
- Chatarra (Scrap Iron) Beach

=== San Juan ===
- Balneario del Escambron, Old San Juan
- Playita del Condado
- Playa del Condado (Condado Beach)
- Ocean Park Beach
- Punta Las Marias
- Posita Beach

=== Manati ===
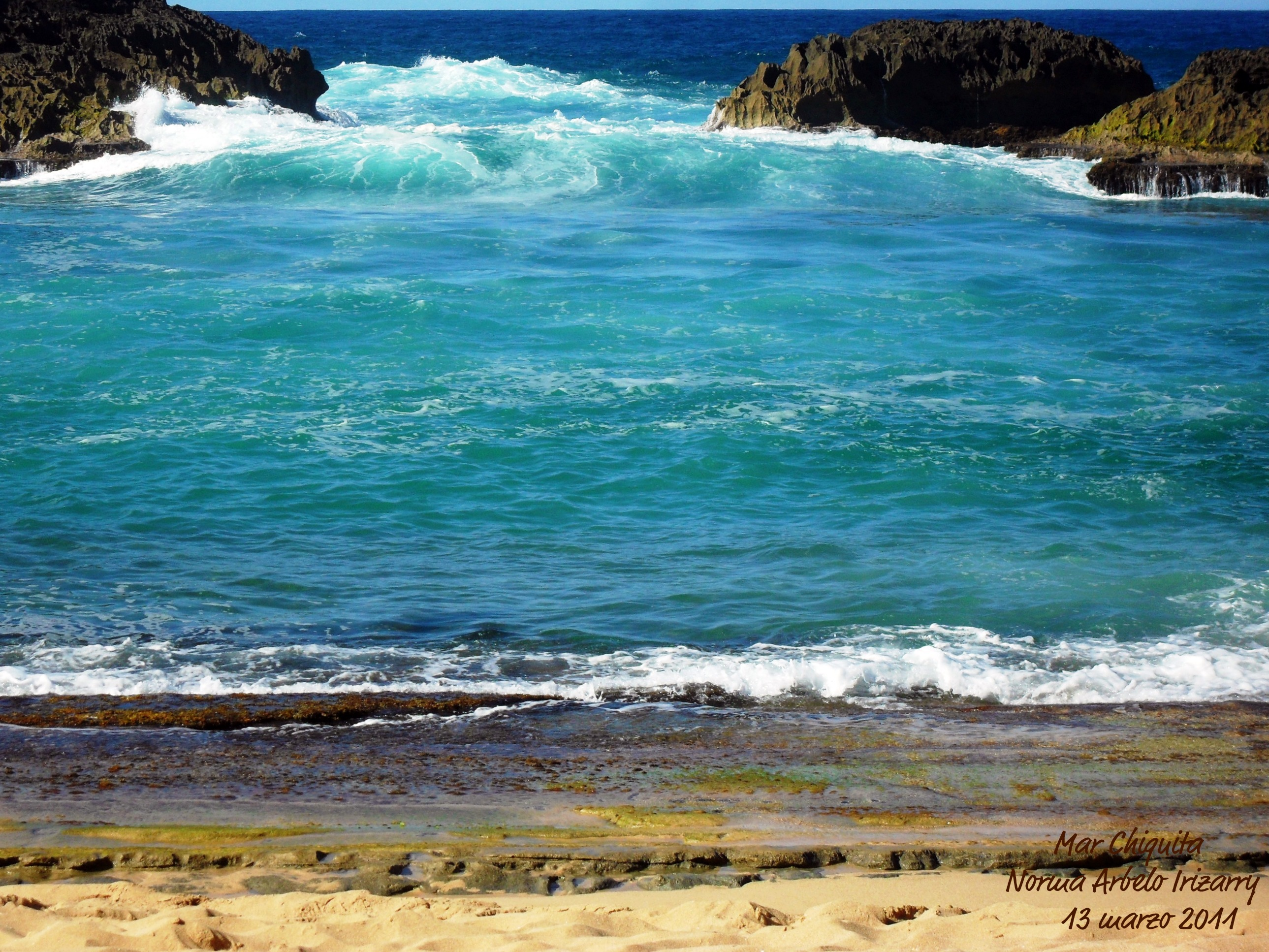
Mar Chiquita can be dangerous

- Los Tubos Beach
- Mar Chiquita Beach, Manati
- Tortuguero Beach, Manati

=== Barceloneta ===
- Puerto de las Vacas Beach
- Las Criollas

=== Camuy ===
- Peñon Brusi Beach
- Amador Beach
- Puerto Hermina Beach

=== Others ===
- Cerro Gordo, Vega Alta
- Mar Bella, Vega Baja
- Poza del Obispo Beach, Arecibo

== Southern region beaches ==
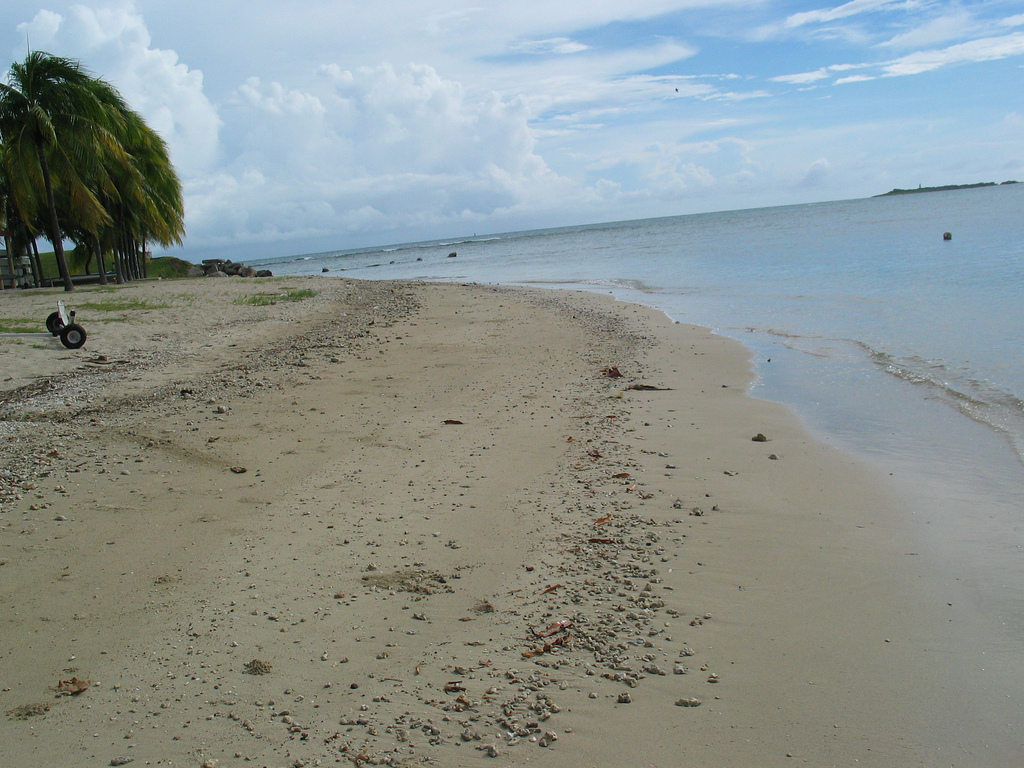
Isla de Gatas Beach at Isla de Gatas, Ponce

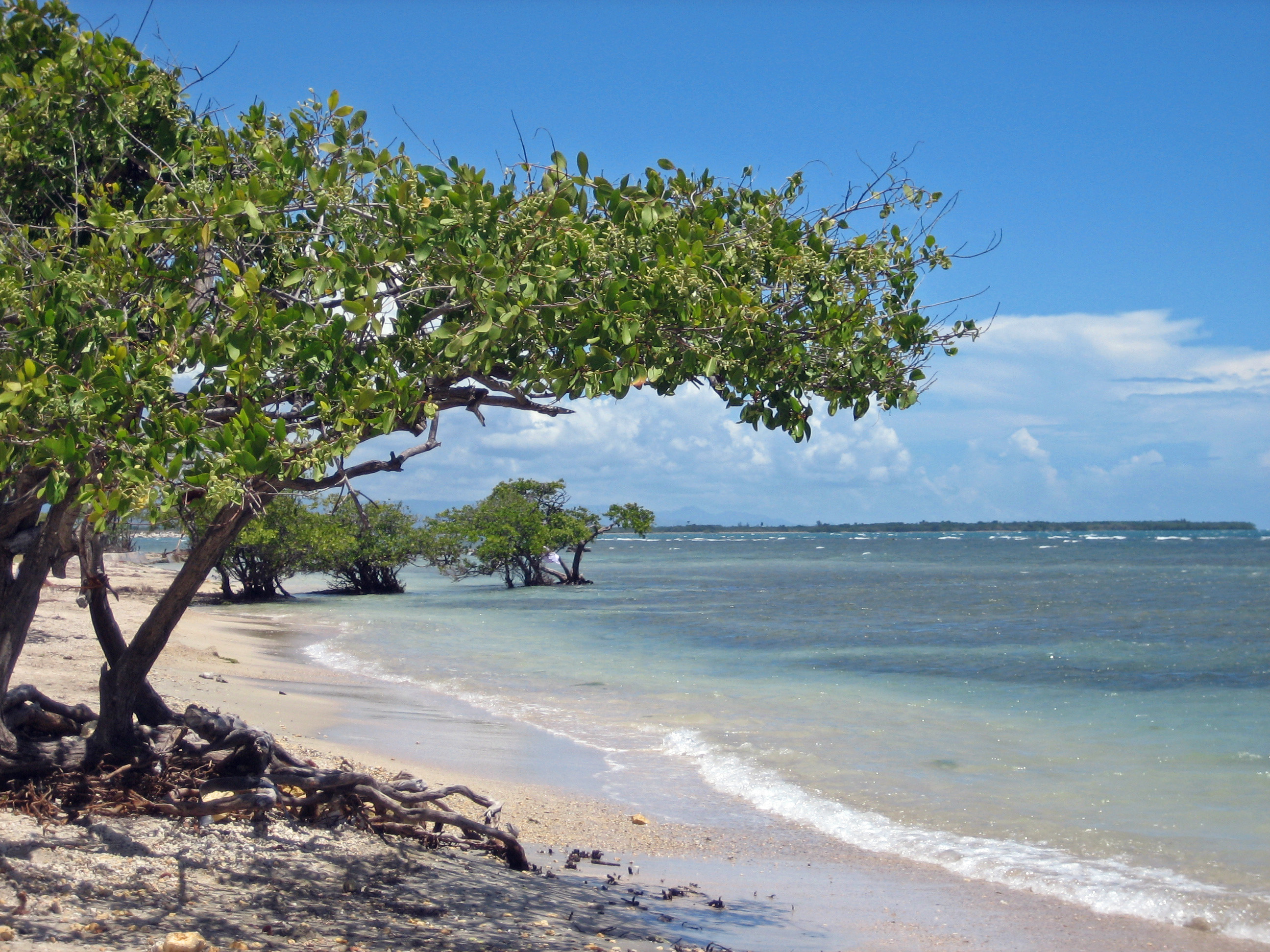
La Guancha Beach in Ponce

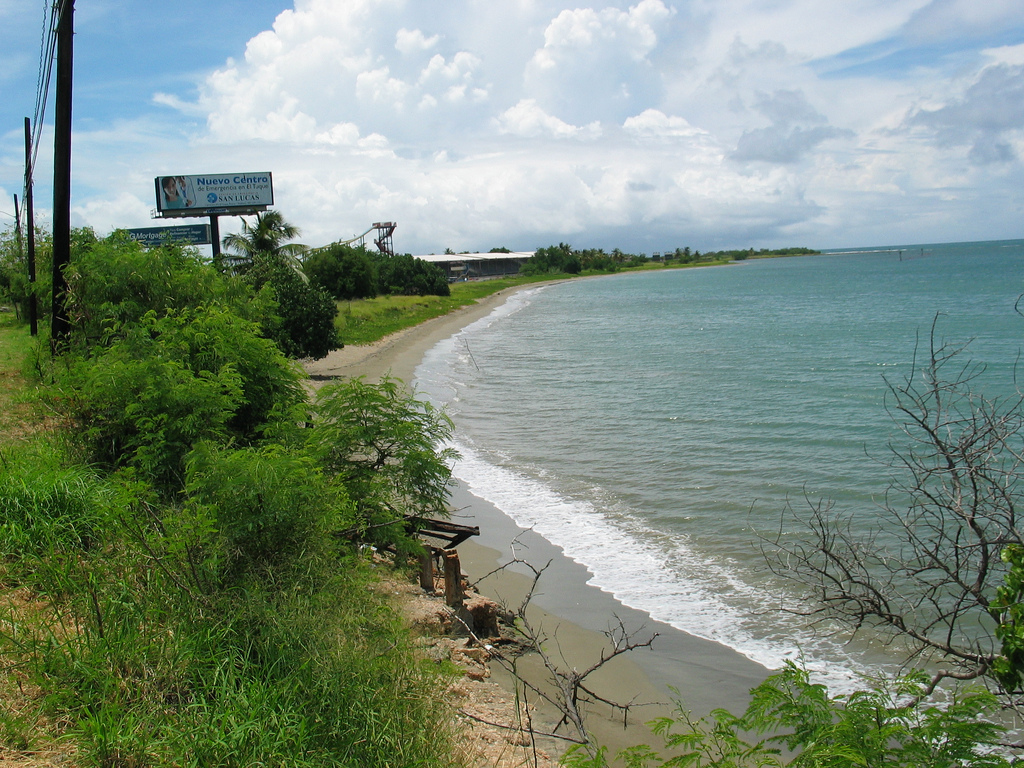
El Tuque Beach in Ponce

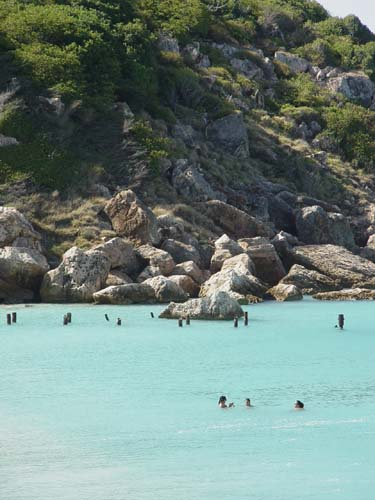
Pelícano Beach in Ponce

Beaches in the Porta Caribe region:

=== Guayanilla ===
- Ventana Beach
- Emajagua Beach
- Tamarindo Beach

=== Patillas ===
- Guardarraya Beach
- Inches Beach
- Escondida Beach
- Punta Viento Beach
- Villa Pesquera Beach

=== Ponce ===
- El Tuque
- La Guancha Beach
- Caja de Muertos Beaches
  - Playa Pelícano
  - Playa Coast Guard
  - Playa Carrucho
  - Playa Larga
- Isla de Gatas Beach
- Playa Cañas
- Playa Carenero
- Playa de Ponce
- Playa Las Salinas
- Playa Punta Cabuyón
- Playa Vayas

=== Salinas ===
- Cayo Matias Beach
- Salinas Beach

=== Santa Isabel ===
- Santa Isabel Beach
- Jauca Beach
- Playa Clavellina

=== Others ===
- Punta Guilarte Beach, Arroyo
- Peñuelas Beach, Peñuelas

== Western region beaches ==
Beaches that belong to the region of Porta del Sol:

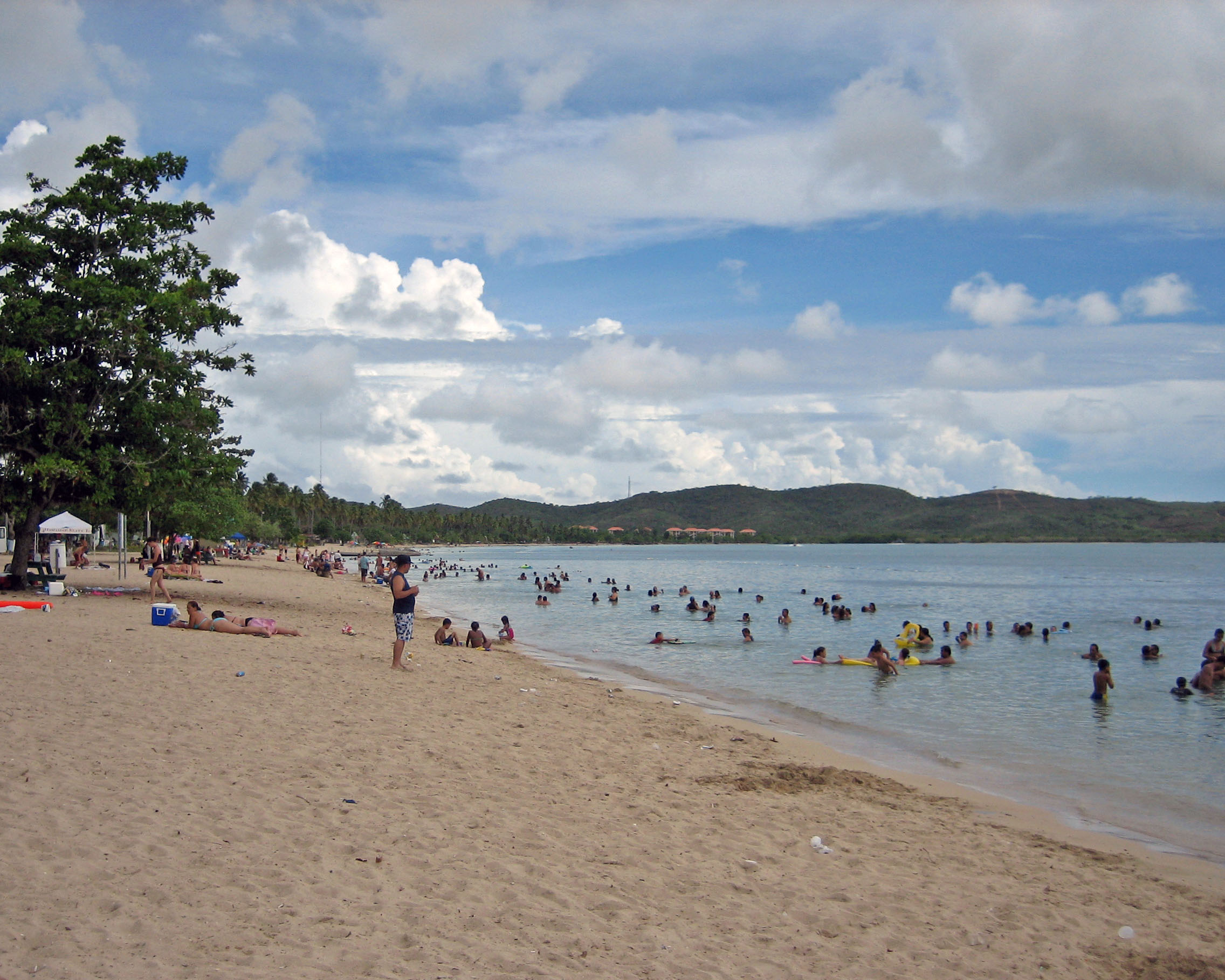
Looking south at Boquerón public beach

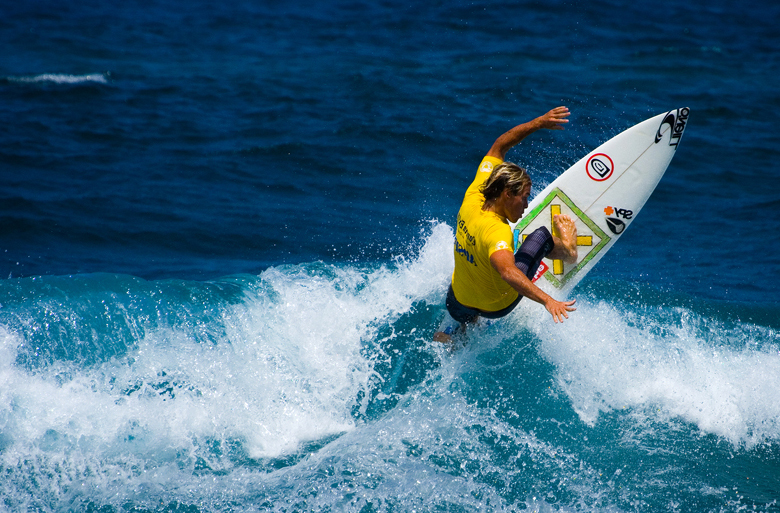
Middles Beach, a popular spot for surfing

=== Quebradillas ===
- Guajataca Beach

=== Isabela ===
- Blue Hole Beach
- La Pocita de Isabela
- Golondrinas Cave Beach
- Bajura Beach
- Baño La Princesa & Blowhole Beach
- Guajataca Beach
- Jobos Beach
- El Pastillo Beach
- Montones Beach
- Punta Sardinera Beach
- Shacks Beach
- Pozo Teodoro Beach
- Middles Beach

=== Aguadilla ===
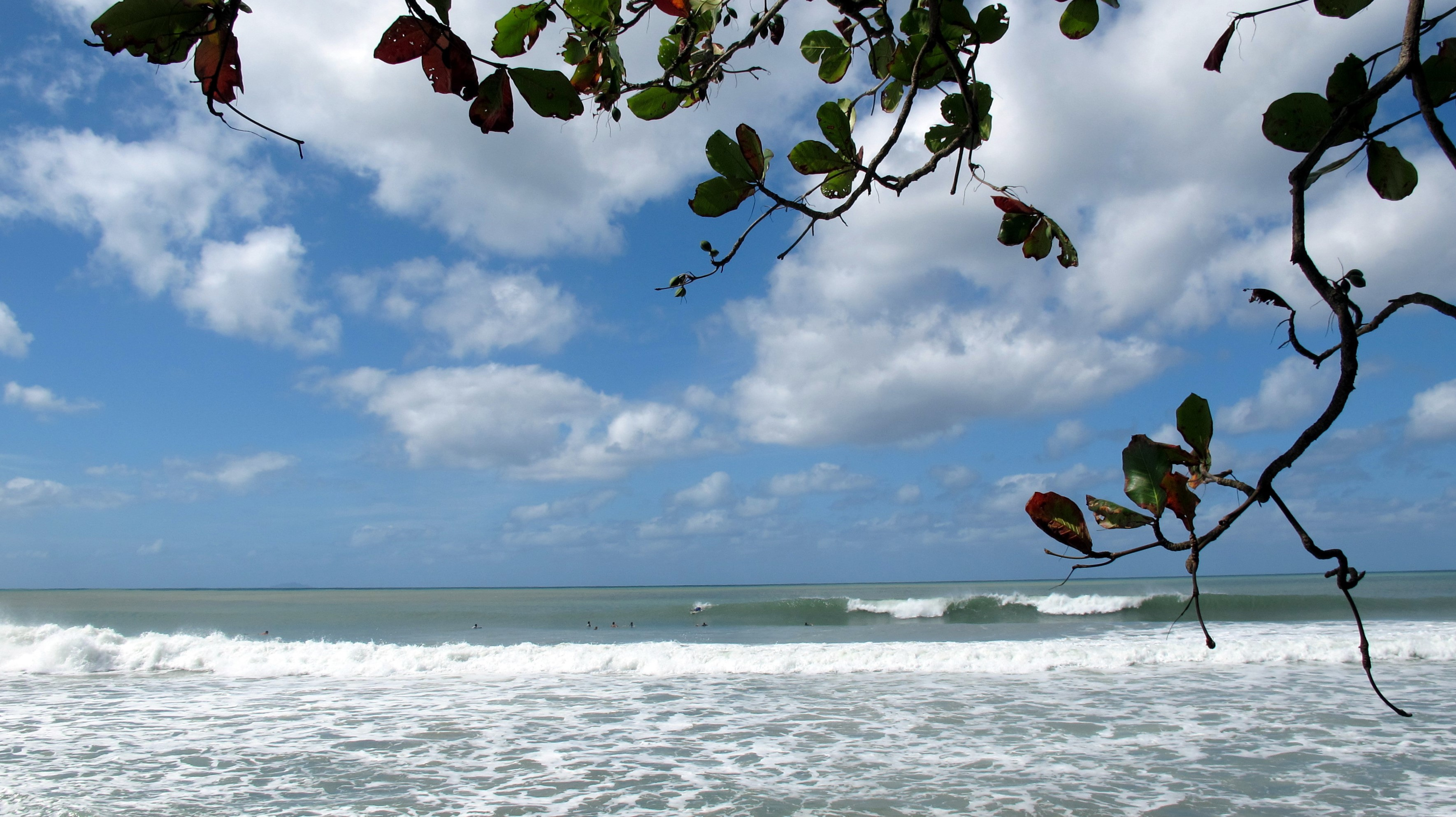
Surfers at Schoolyards Beach surf spot in Aguadilla

- Crash Boat Beach
- La Ponderosa Beach
- La Poza Beach
- La Saldinera Beach
- Gas Chambers
- Wilderness
- Peña Blanca Beach
- Schoolyards Beach

=== Aguada ===
- Aguada Beach
- Pico Piedra
- Playa Espinar

=== Rincon ===
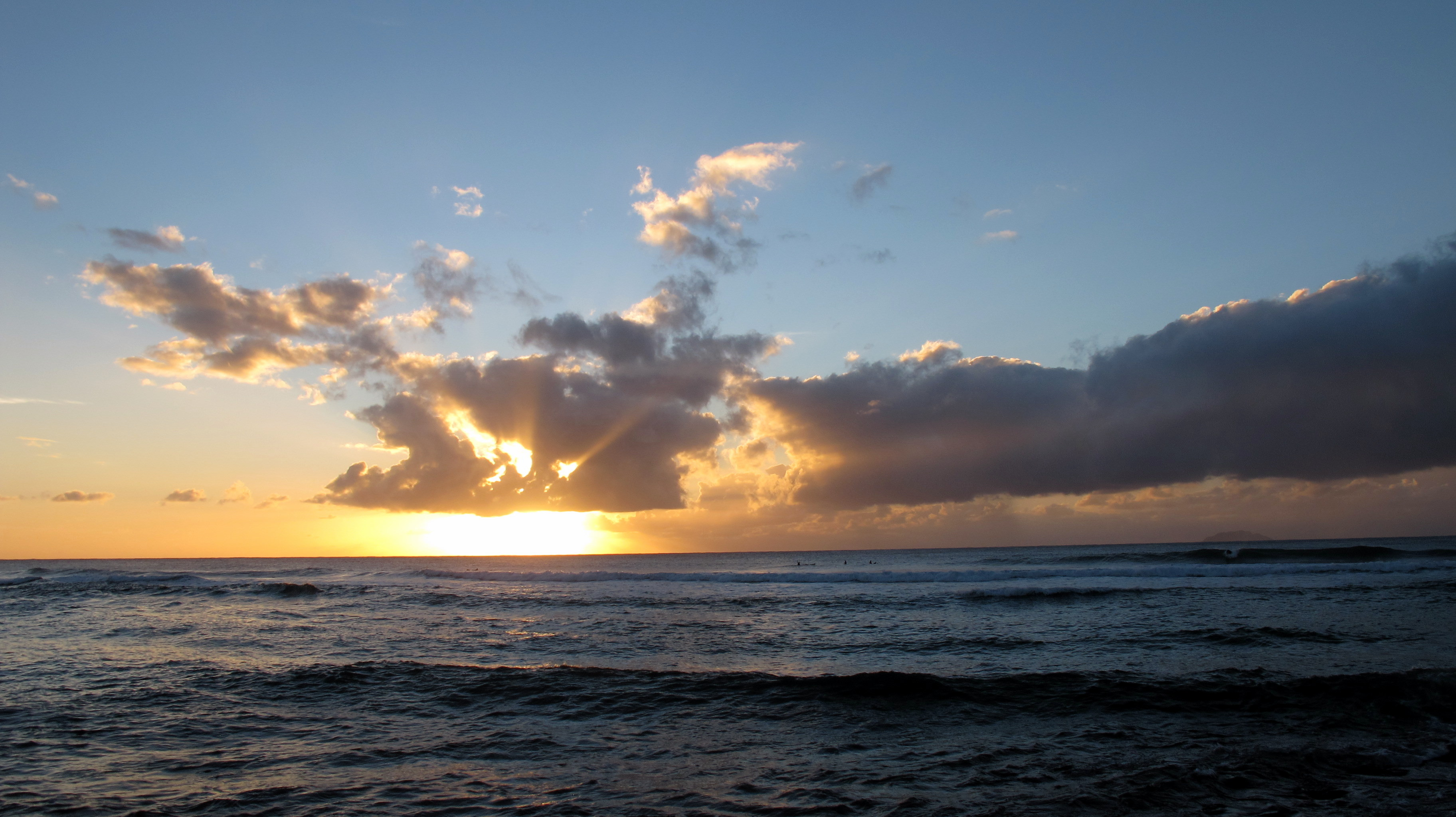
Surfers at Maria's Beach

Many of Rincon's beaches are frequented for surfing.

- Balneario de Rincón
- Corcega Beach
- Domes Beach
- María's Beach
- Sandy Beach
- Steps Beach
- Tres Palmas

=== Añasco ===
- Balneario Tres Hermanos

=== Mayagüez ===
- Beaches of Mona Island

=== Cabo Rojo ===
- Boquerón
- Playa Buyé
- El Combate
- La Playuela (Playa Sucia)
- Playa La Mela
- Punta Arenas Beach
- Isla de Ratones

=== Lajas ===
- Playita Rosada
- Cayo Caracoles
- Cayo Mata la Gata
- Cayo Enrique

=== Guánica ===
- Las Paldas
- La Jungla
- Playa Santa
- Ballenas
- Gilligan's Island
- Atolladora Beach
- Playa Manglillo Pequeño
- Tamarindo Beach
- Caña Gorda Beach
- Jaboncillo Beach

== Gallery ==
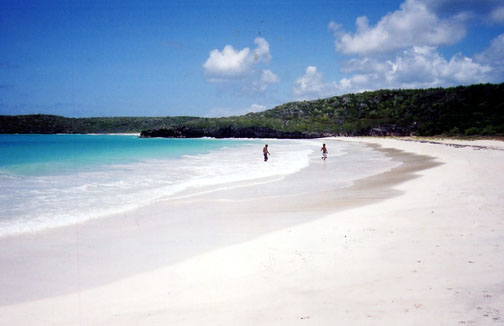
Philipp Corcho Beach in Vieques

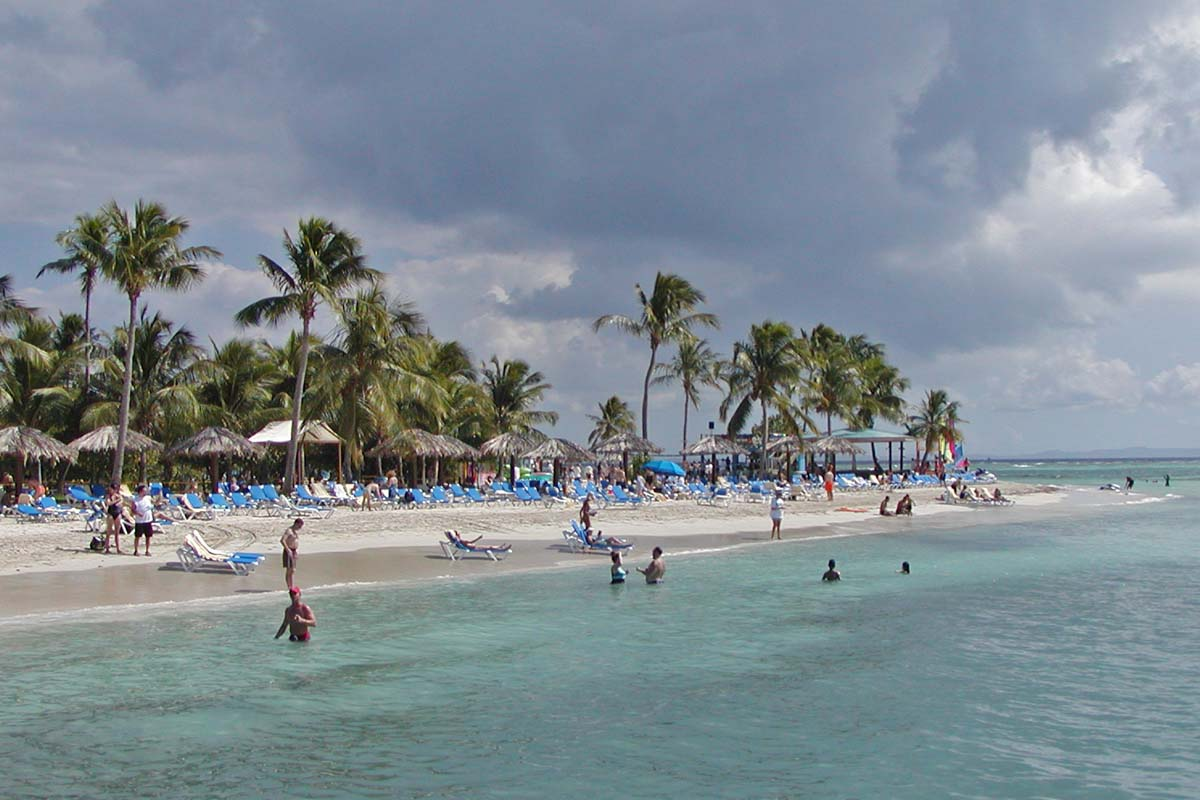
Palomino Island beach in Fajardo

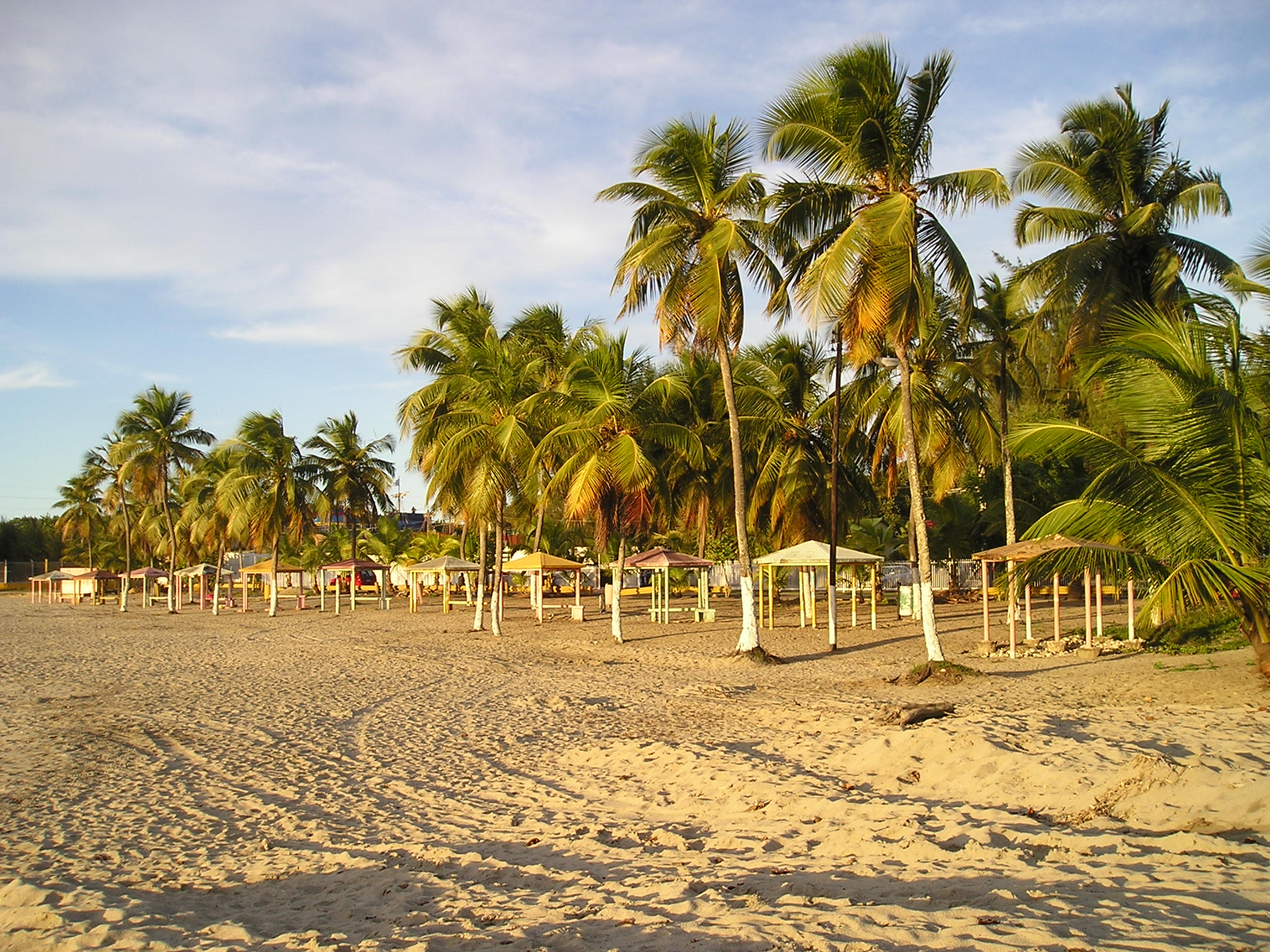
Arecibo beach near the El Vigia lighthouse

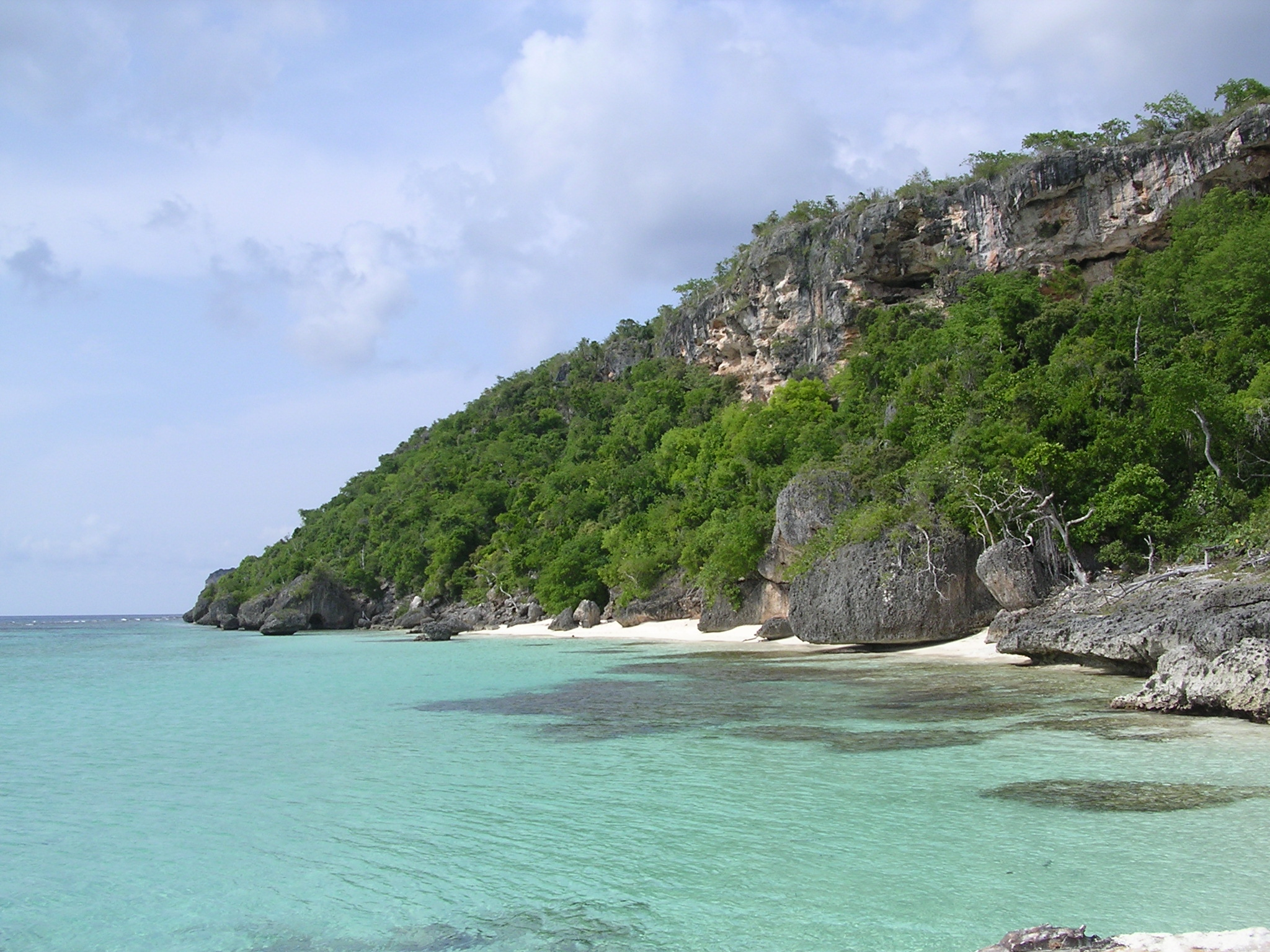
Mona Island Beach

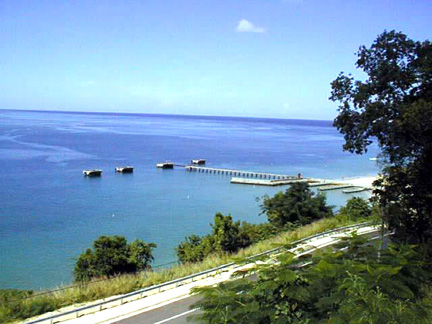
Crash Boat Beach in Aguadilla

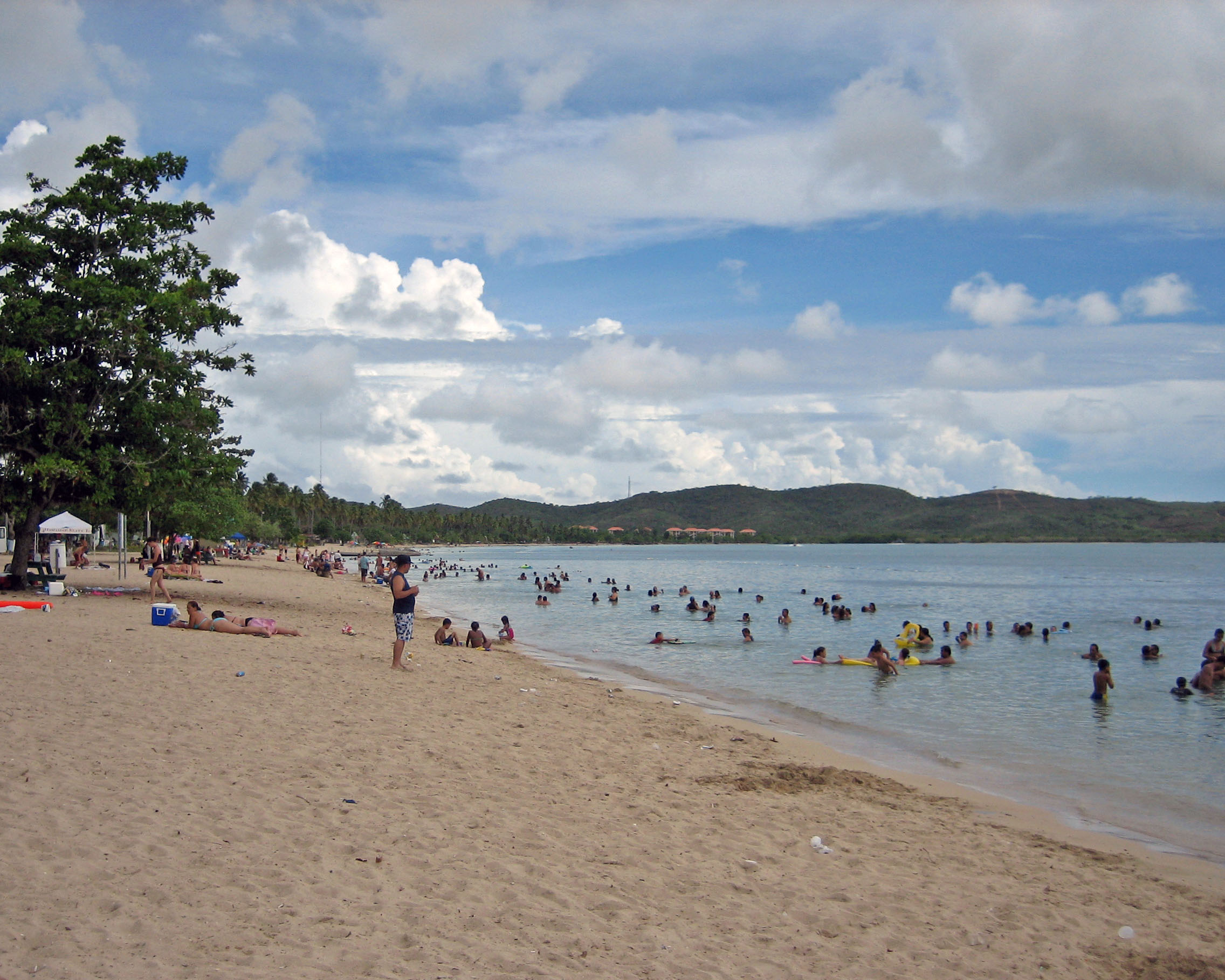
Boquerón public beach

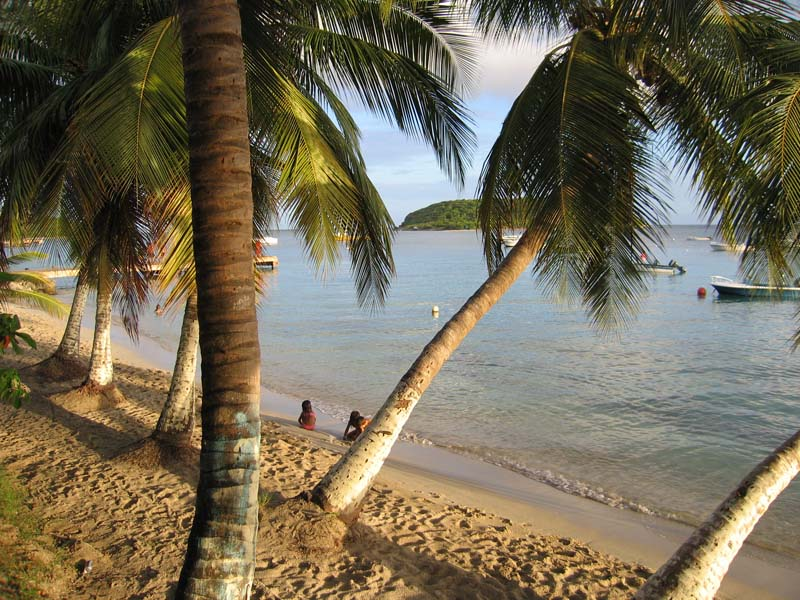
Esperanza Beach in Vieques

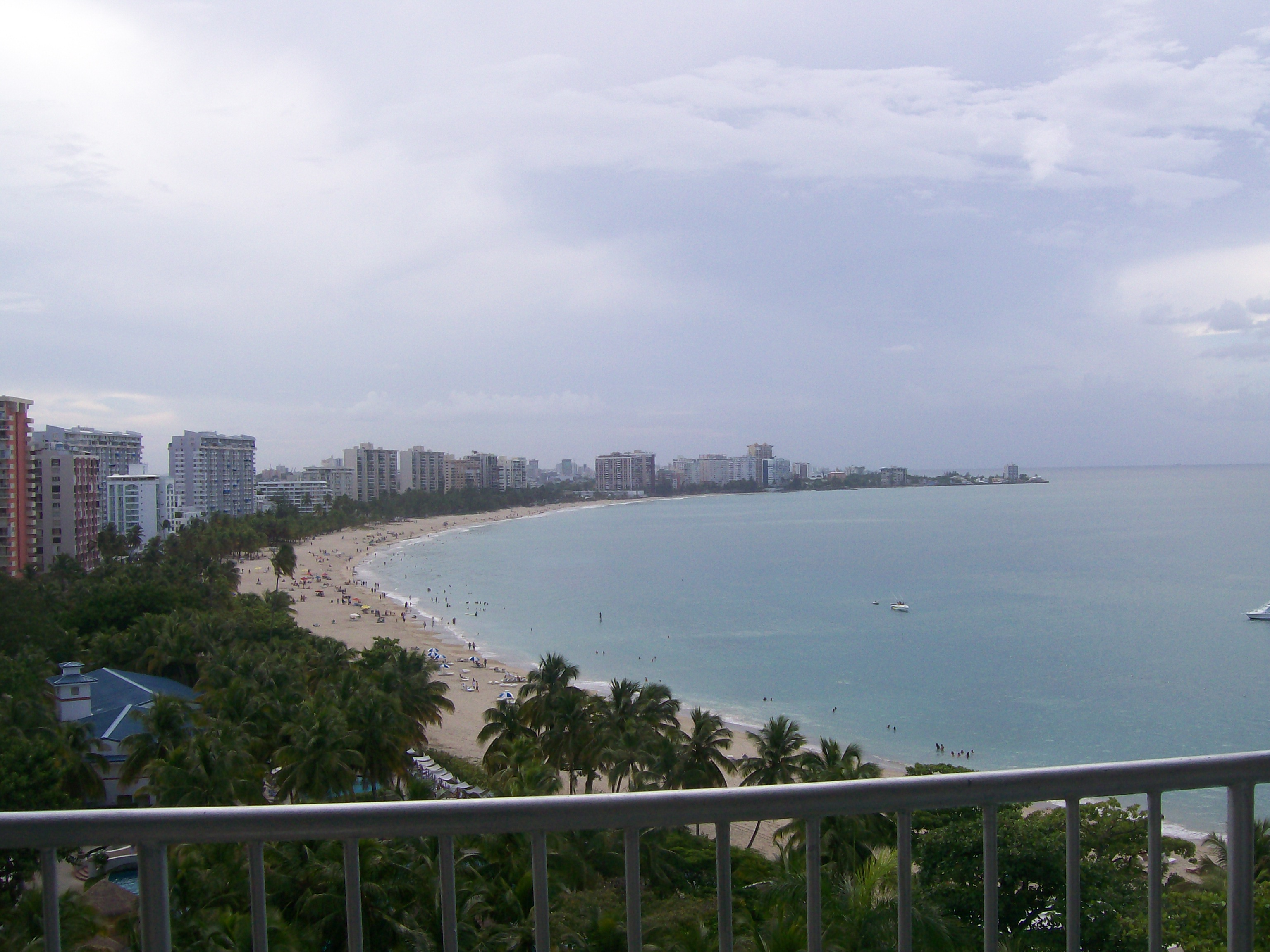
Isla Verde Beach

Sirena Beach

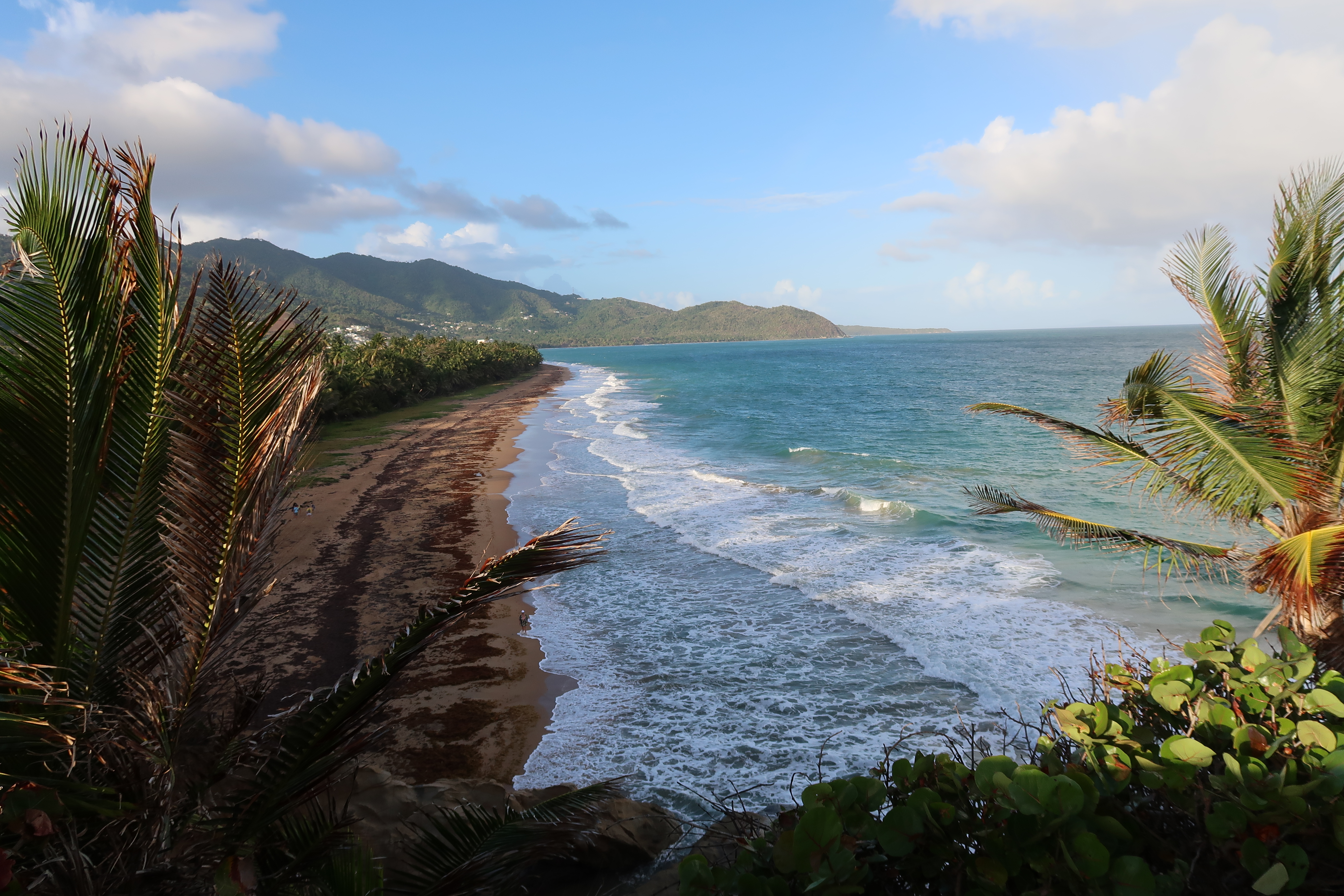
Punta Tuna Beach in Maunabo

== See also ==
- List of beaches
- List of beaches in the United States
