= Guayabo River =

River of Puerto Rico

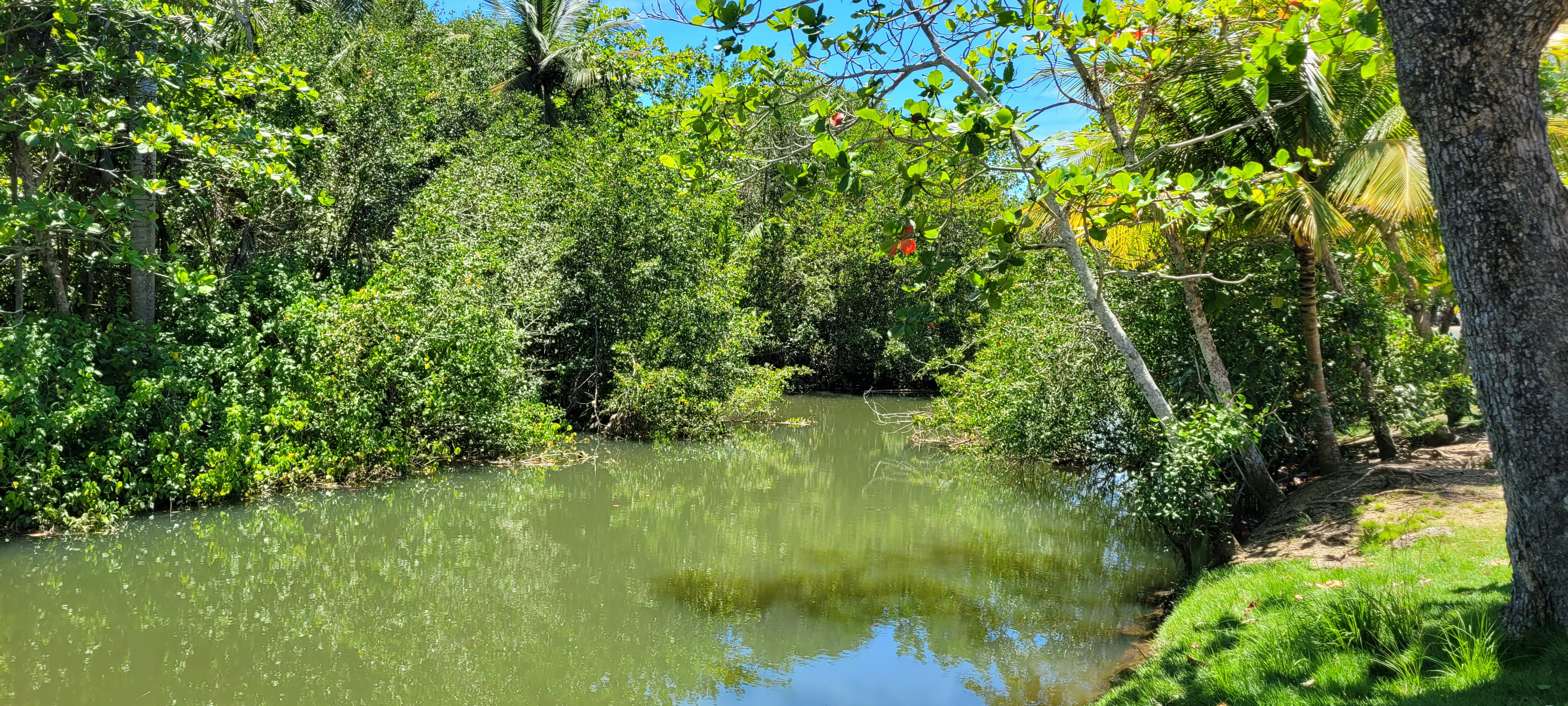
- Guayabo River in Pico de Piedra Beach
- Native name: Río Guayabo (Spanish)

Location
- Commonwealth: Puerto Rico

Physical characteristics
- Source
  - coordinates: 18.3838351°N 67.2137921°W

The Guayabo River (Spanish: Río Guayabo), is a river of Aguada, Puerto Rico.

== See also ==
- List of rivers of Puerto Rico
