= Flamenco Beach =

Beach in Culebra Island, Puerto Rico

Flamenco Beach Playa Flamenco
- Beach
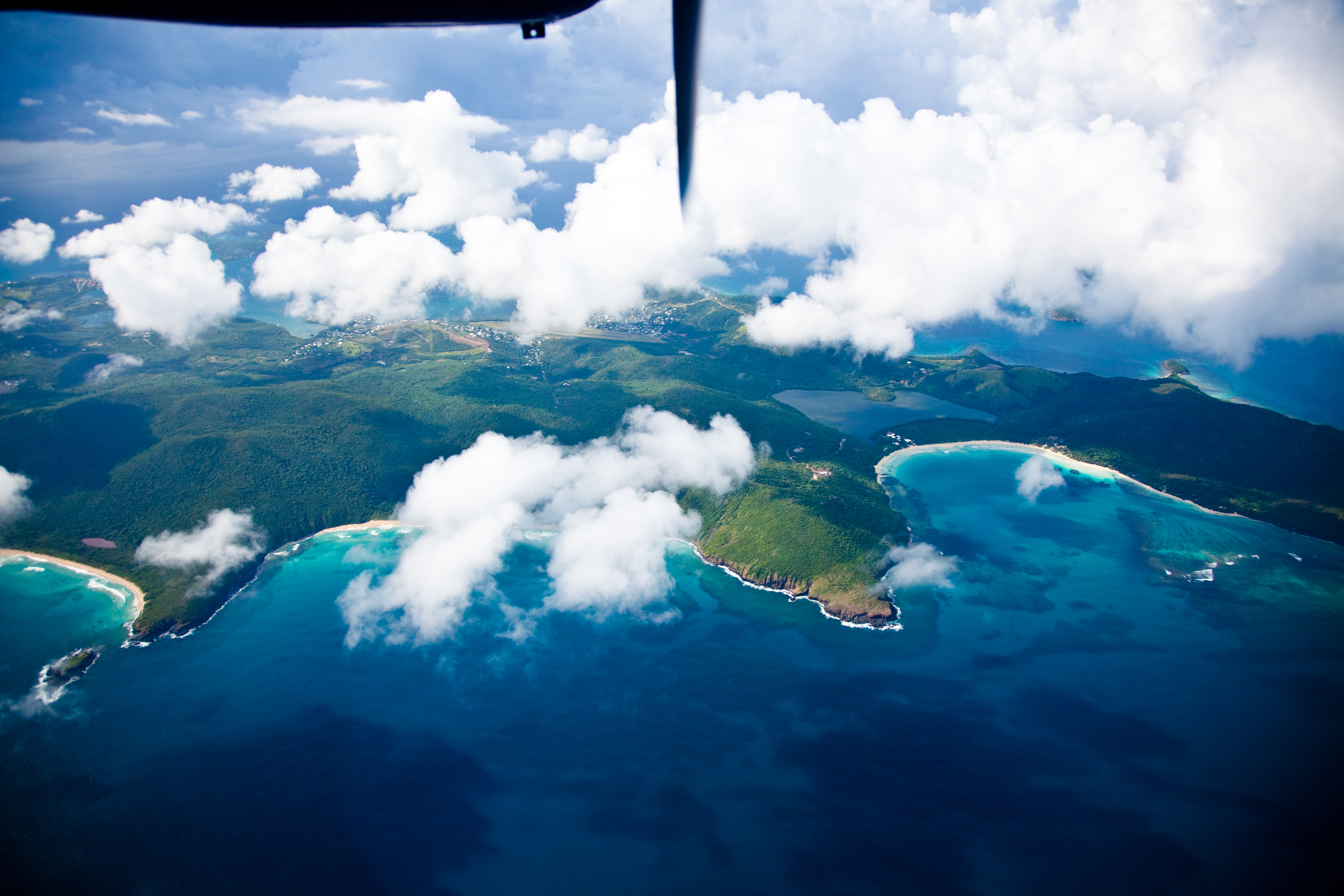
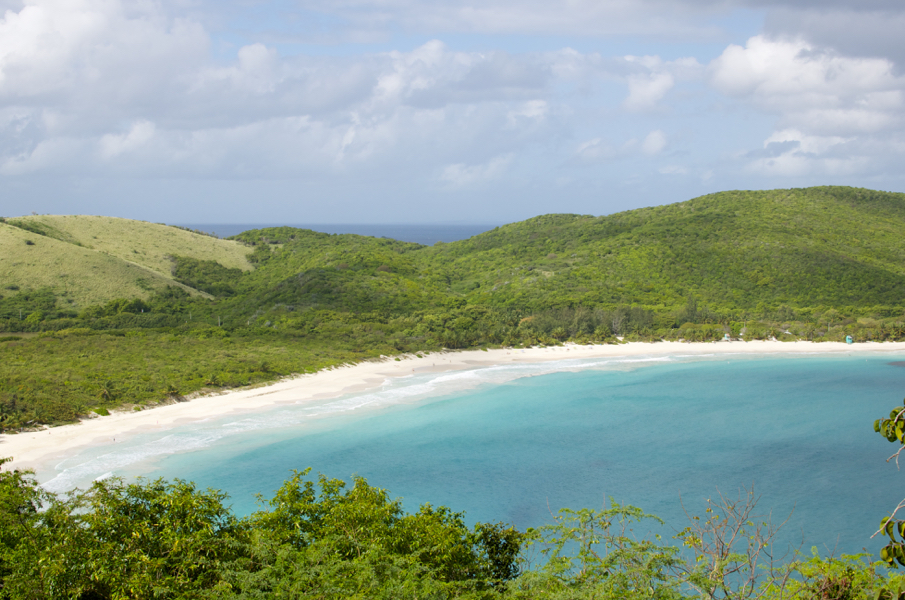
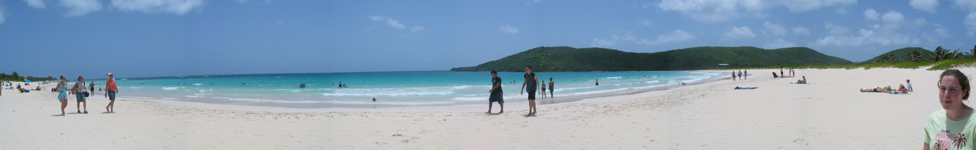
- Aerial view of Flamenco Beach (right) in northwestern Culebra Island, 2010 Panoramic view of Flamenco Beach, 2014 Panoramic view from Flamenco Beach, 2004
- Interactive map
- Map of Puerto Rico
- Coordinates: 18.331667°N 65.318056°W
- Commonwealth: Puerto Rico
- Municipality: Culebra Island
- Barrio: Flamenco
- Activities: Swimming Camping Scuba Diving or snorkeling
- Lifeguards: YES, on duty
- Blue Flag Beach Status: Active

Flamenco Beach is a public beach on an open bay connected to the North Atlantic Ocean in northwestern Culebra, an island-municipality of Puerto Rico, part of the Spanish Virgin Islands in the Leeward Islands of the Lesser Antilles in the West Indies of the Caribbean. Situated in front of Flamenco Lagoon and stretching for about 1 mile (1.6 km) around the reef-sheltered, horseshoe-shaped Flamenco Bay, the beach is known for its shallow, calm turquoise waters and white sand, as well as its species-rich swimming areas and diving sites. Accessible by plane or boat from Puerto Rico, it is a popular destination for domestic and foreign visitors, ranking 3rd best beach in the world with a TripAdvisor Travelers' Choice Award in 2013, and regaining its Blue Flag Beach international distinction in 2016.

== Geography ==
Flamenco Beach is located on the northwestern shore of Culebra in the archipelago of Puerto Rico. The beach lies on a mile-wide, horseshoe strip of coast, which comprises a bay called Bahía Flamenco (Flamenco Bay). Behind the beach lies a lagoon called Laguna del Flamenco (Flamenco Lagoon). The beach is named for the numerous Caribbean flamingos (Phoenicopterus ruber) that were once prevalent in the lagoon.

The beach is bordered by the Culebra National Wildlife Refuge, which is of itself one of the oldest wildlife preserves in the United States. Off the coast of Flamenco, approximately a quarter mile, is a reef where the surf breaks. Characteristic of Flamenco is the beach's white sand and shallow clear waters.

=== Flora and fauna ===
The waters off Flamenco beach are home to species of parrot fish, blue tang, multiple species of wrasse, and other Caribbean Sea fish species. Crustacean species such as Ghost Crab are also observed. Some 50,000 seabirds visit Culebra's Flamenco Peninsula each summer to nest—mostly sooty terns and other migratory species. Summer visitors to Flamenco Beach are familiar with them as they often feed in the area in large numbers. By September, the birds have gathered up their broods and flown out to sea only to return home the following summer. Occasionally, leatherback and hawksbill sea turtles may be seen as the beaches of the Culebra archipelago are also a major breeding ground for them and the adjacent sea grass beds provide shelter and food for green sea turtles.

=== Rusting tanks ===
Two corroded M4 Sherman tanks remain on the beach. The United States Navy left them behind when it departed Flamenco Beach in 1975, after using the area as a weapons-testing ground for more than 30 years. Exposure to salty sea air has rusted the tanks, and residents and visitors have covered them with graffiti.

== Gallery ==
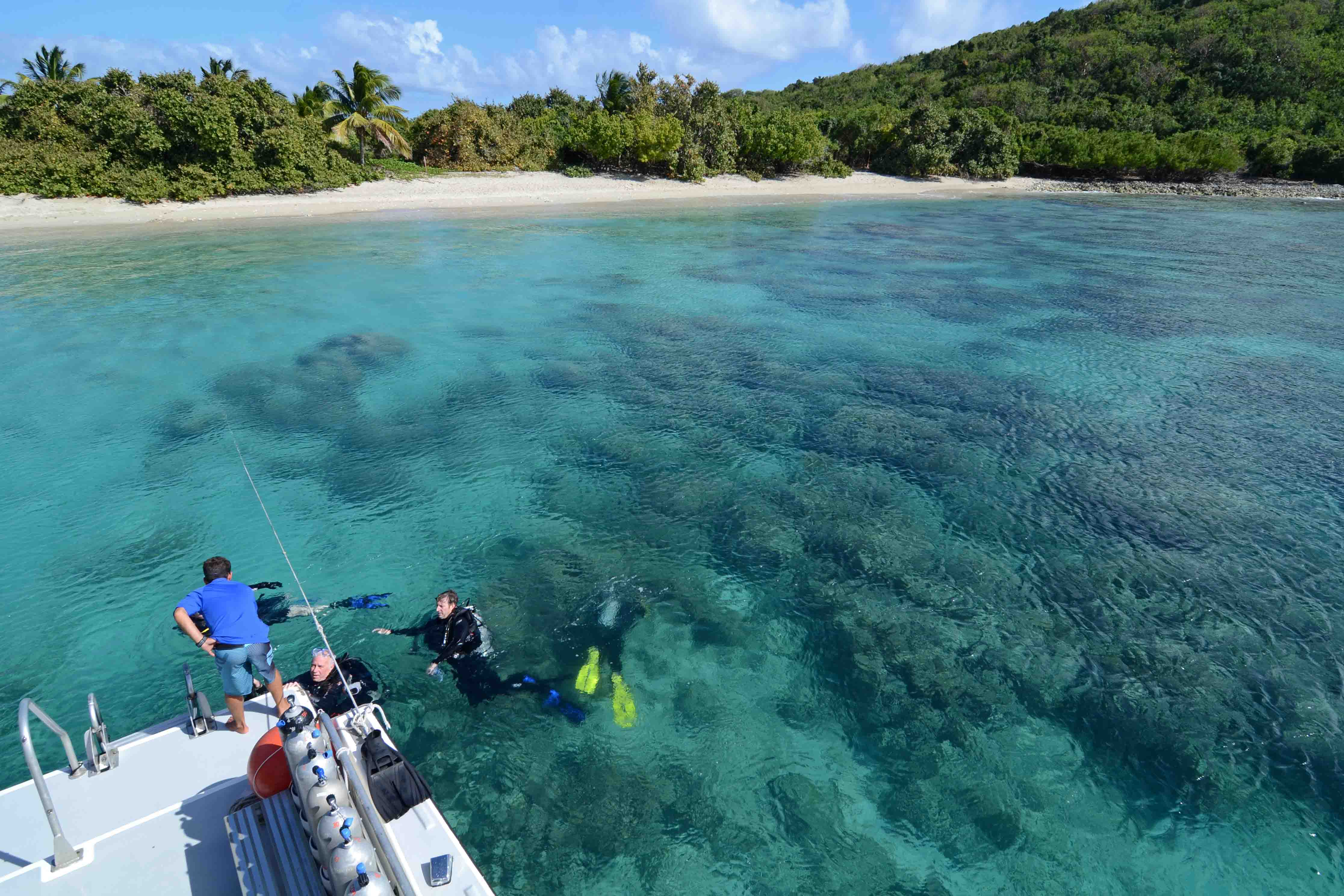
Dive sites at the beach

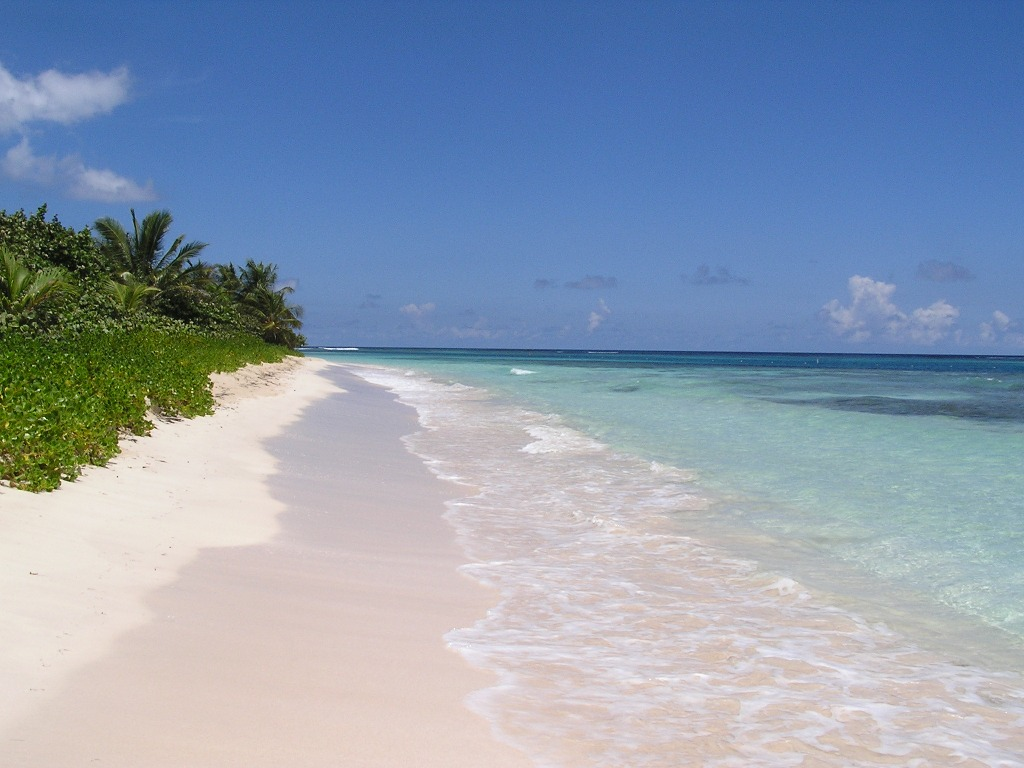
Isolated part of Flamenco Beach

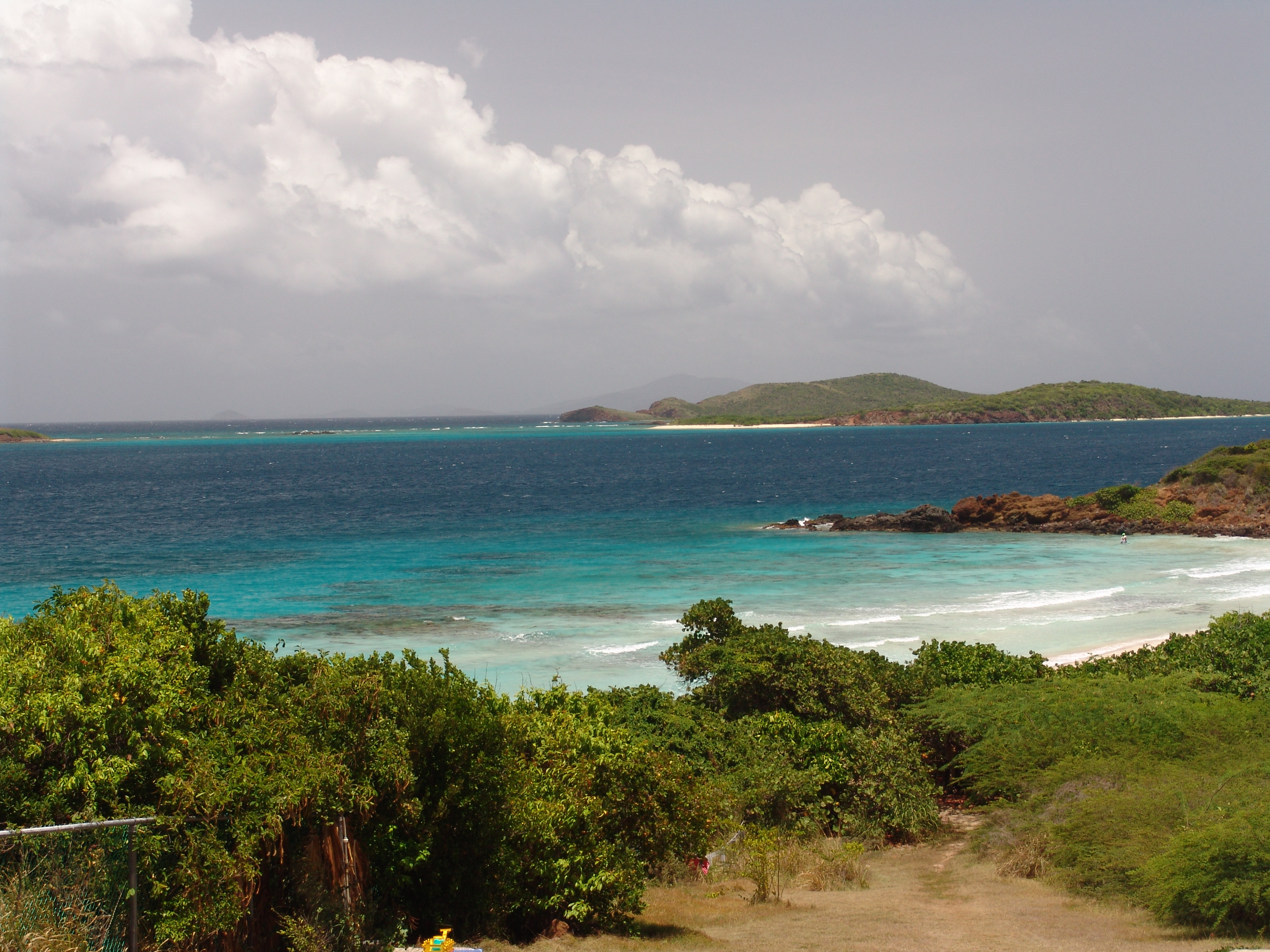
General view

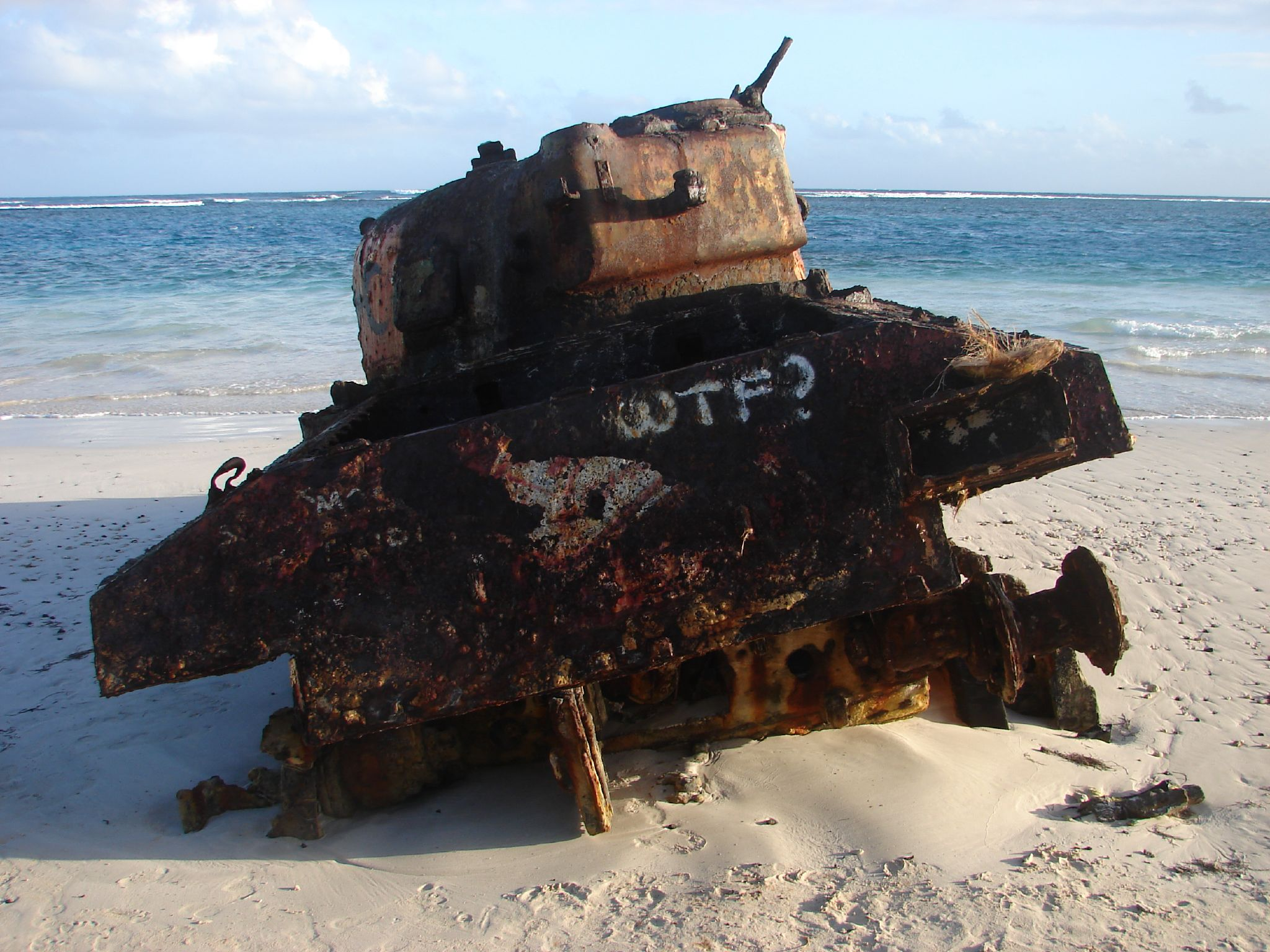
"WTF?" spray painted on the rear of a Sherman tank left over from U.S. military shelling practice

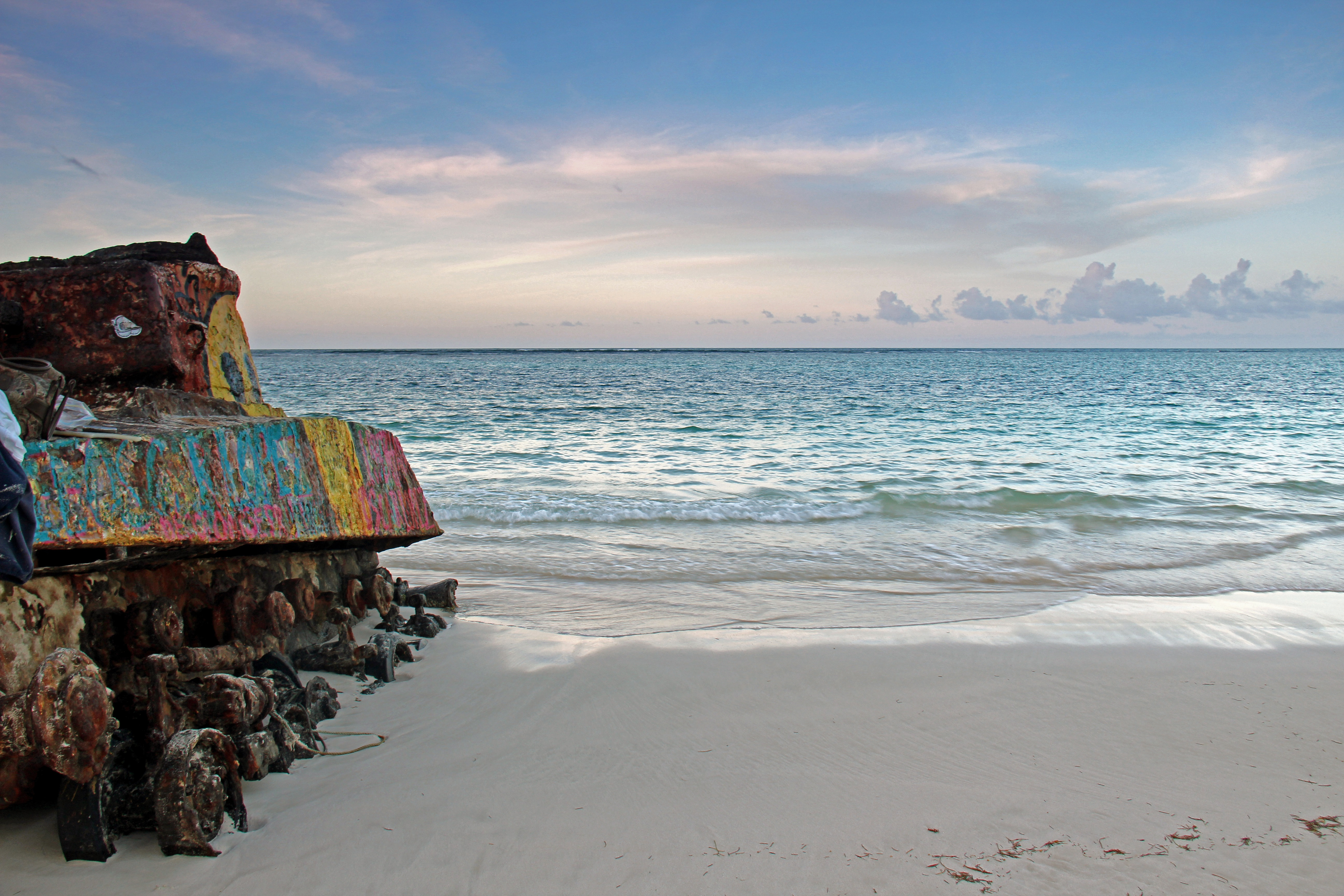
U.S. military tank on Flamenco Beach

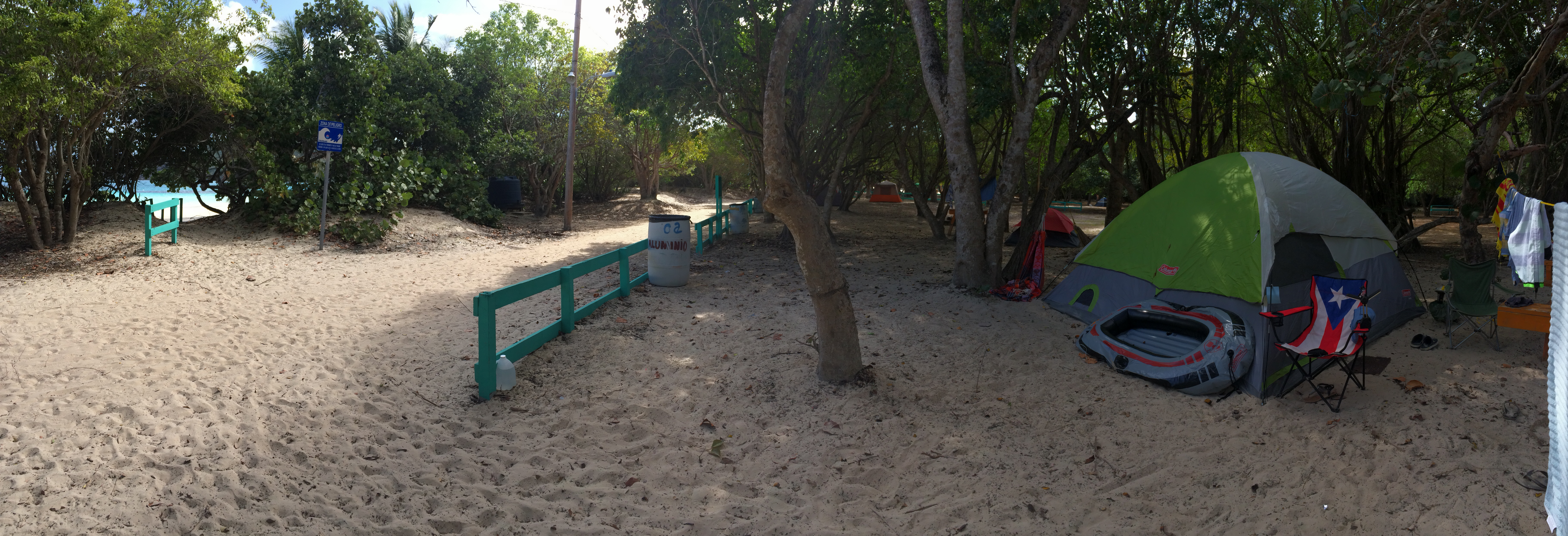
Camping Site at Flamenco Beach

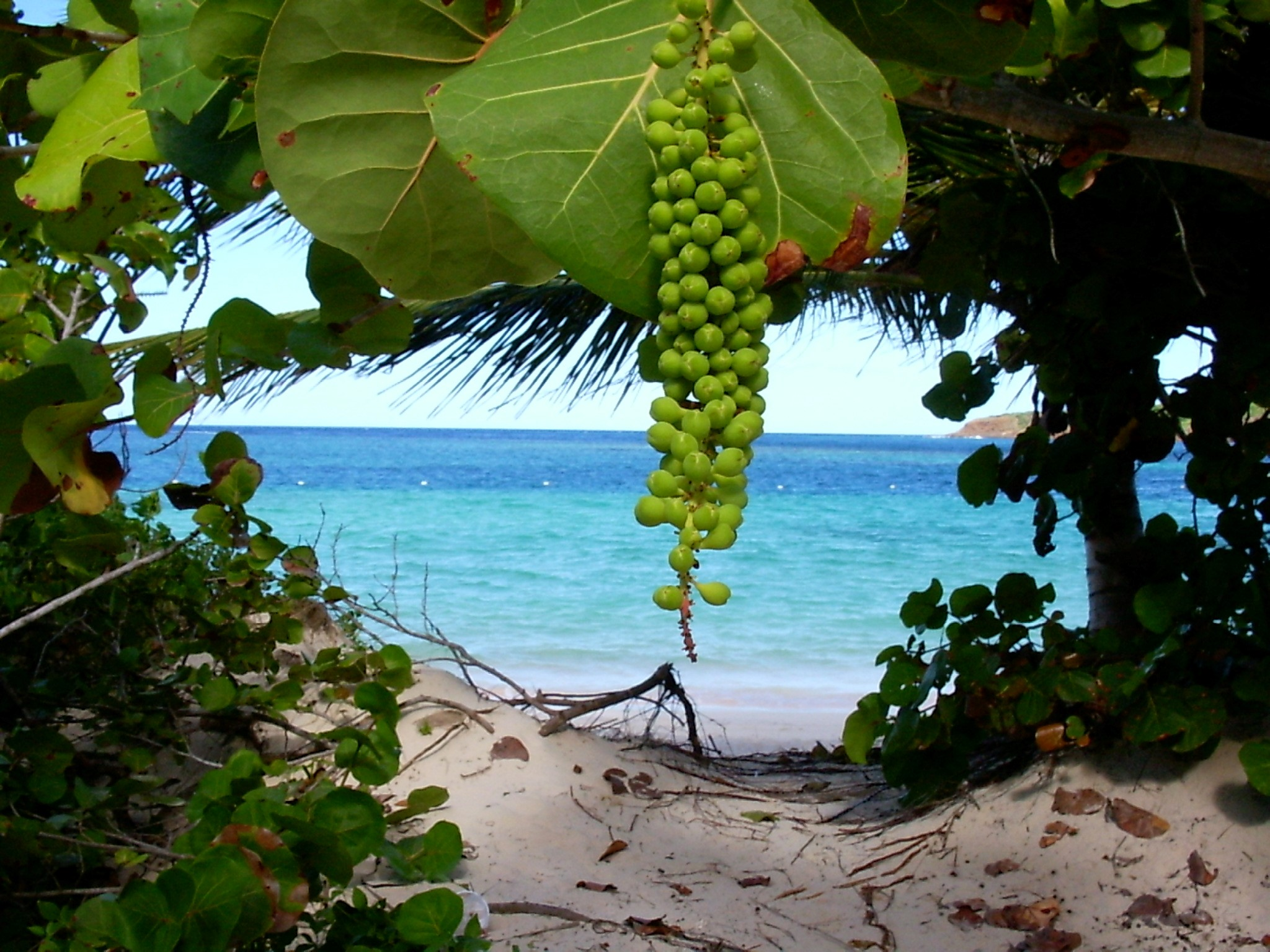
Campsite at Flamenco Beach

== Tourism ==
Flamenco Beach is the top ranked beach in Puerto Rico and one of the top beaches in the world. The beach has available lifeguard towers, kiosks selling food, beach accessories, and easy access from the town of Dewey (where the ferry boat arrives).

=== World ranking through the years ===
- 3rd in 2014 by TripAdvisor Travelers' Choice Awards
- 8th in 2015 by Tripadvisor Travelers' Choice Awards
- 6th in 2016 by TripAdvisor Travelers' Choice Awards
- 13th in 2017 by TripAdvisor Travelers' Choice Awards

=== Facilities ===
The beach has bathroom facilities and showers. There are about a half-dozen kiosks selling local food. This include piña colada, mango smoothies, rice-and-beans burritos and all manner of seafood, from conch salad to fish skewers. Flamenco Beach has a designated camping area for a fee which provides potable water, bathrooms and shower facilities.

== Recreation ==
- Swimming: Areas designated with buoys. Shallow waters allow a safe environment for swimmers and non-swimmers.
- Sunbathing: Excellent conditions year-round but beware of the tropical sun as exposure without proper sunblock may create uncomfortable situations such as sunburns and moderate to extreme itching when healing.
- Scuba and snorkeling: There are reefs, urchins, a variety of fish species and other marine wildlife.
- Sand: white sand receives the shallow turquoise waters.
- Walking and hiking: The horseshoe bay provides a walk path and surrounding trails are another way to look for bird-watching opportunities or photograph surrounding nature.

== See also ==
- Crash Boat Beach
- La Pocita de Isabela
- List of beaches in Puerto Rico
- Puerto Rico Tourism Company
