= Balneario de Rincón =

Beach in Puerto Rico

Coordinates: 18.3376436°N 67.2541605°W

Balneario de Rincón is a public beach in Rincón, Puerto Rico. It hosted the Triathlon events for the 2010 Central American and Caribbean Games.
