= Playa Espinar =

Beach in Puerto Rico

Coordinates: 18.3916128°N 67.1962921°W

Playa Espinar is a beach on the north-west coast of Puerto Rico, in the town of Aguada. The beach is 760 meters long.

== See also ==
- List of beaches in Puerto Rico
