= La Pocita de las Golondrinas Beach =

Beach in Isabela, Puerto Rico

La Pocita de las Golondrinas Beach La Pocita de Isabela, Playa Poza De Teodoro
- Beach
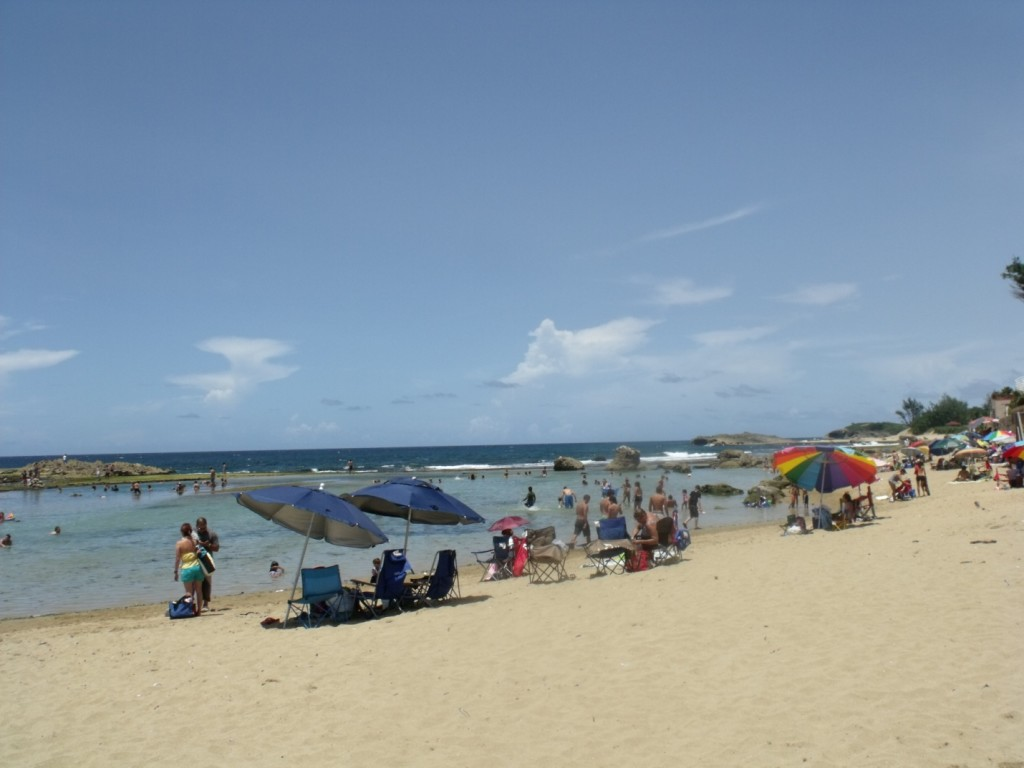
- Interactive map of La Pocita de las Golondrinas Beach
- Country: United States
- Territory: Puerto Rico
- Municipality: Isabela

Playa Jobos
- Interactive map of Playa Jobos
- 18.514185°N 67.064136°W
- Location: Isabela, Puerto Rico

La Pocita de las Golondrinas Beach is a small public and natural saltwater beach in Isabela. It is safe for families with children because of its shallow waters (about two feet deep) and lacks entries to the open sea. It is located about five minutes to the right of Montones Beach. Currently this beach does not have facilities. Still, it is surrounded by food kiosks and there are parking lots in walking distance.

== Location ==
It may be reached using PR-466 street in Isabela.

== What can be done ==
- Swimming Limited shallow waters allow a safe environment for swimmers and non swimmers alike. Water is warm, only about two feet deep.
- Sun Bathing: Excellent conditions year round.
- Snorkeling: There are reefs, urchins, many fish and other marine wildlife.
- Sunset: Since located on west side of Puerto Rico the possibilities are greater of an amazing sunset.
- Hotels: There are hotels nearby.

== Facilities ==
- Food: There are kiosks nearby with traditional fried foods such as pastelillos / empanadillas.
- Lifeguards: No Lifeguards available.
- Bathroom facilities: There are no bathroom facilities at the beach, but across the street there are restaurants and kiosks with restrooms.
- Parking: There is a parking lot in walking distance. There is also a spot for parking right on the sand along the street.

== See also ==
- Flamenco Beach
- Crash Boat Beach
- List of beaches in Puerto Rico
- Puerto Rico Tourism Company
