= Pico Piedra =

Beach in Puerto Rico

Coordinates: 18.3852240°N 67.2124032°W

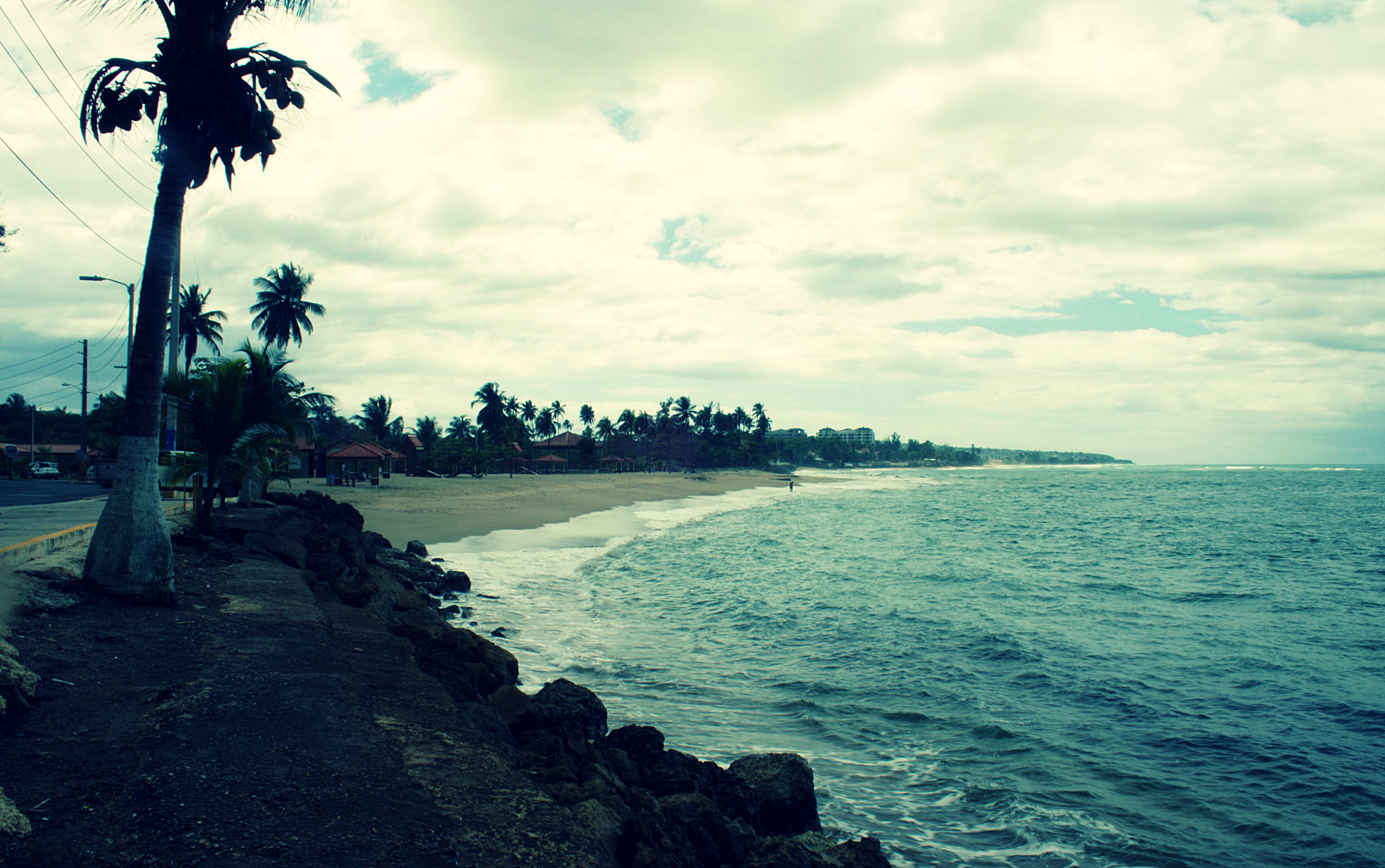
Pico Piedra Beach in Aguada, Puerto Rico

Pico Piedra (or Pico de Piedra) is a beach on the north-west coast of Puerto Rico, at the mouth of the Guayabo River, in the town of Aguada.

Desecheo Island can be seen from Pico de Piedra. An annual patron saint festival is held at this beach around the third week of June in honor of Saint John the Baptist.

== See also ==
- List of beaches in Puerto Rico
