= Crash Boat Beach =

Beach in Aguadilla, Puerto Rico

Crash Boat Beach Playa Crash Boat
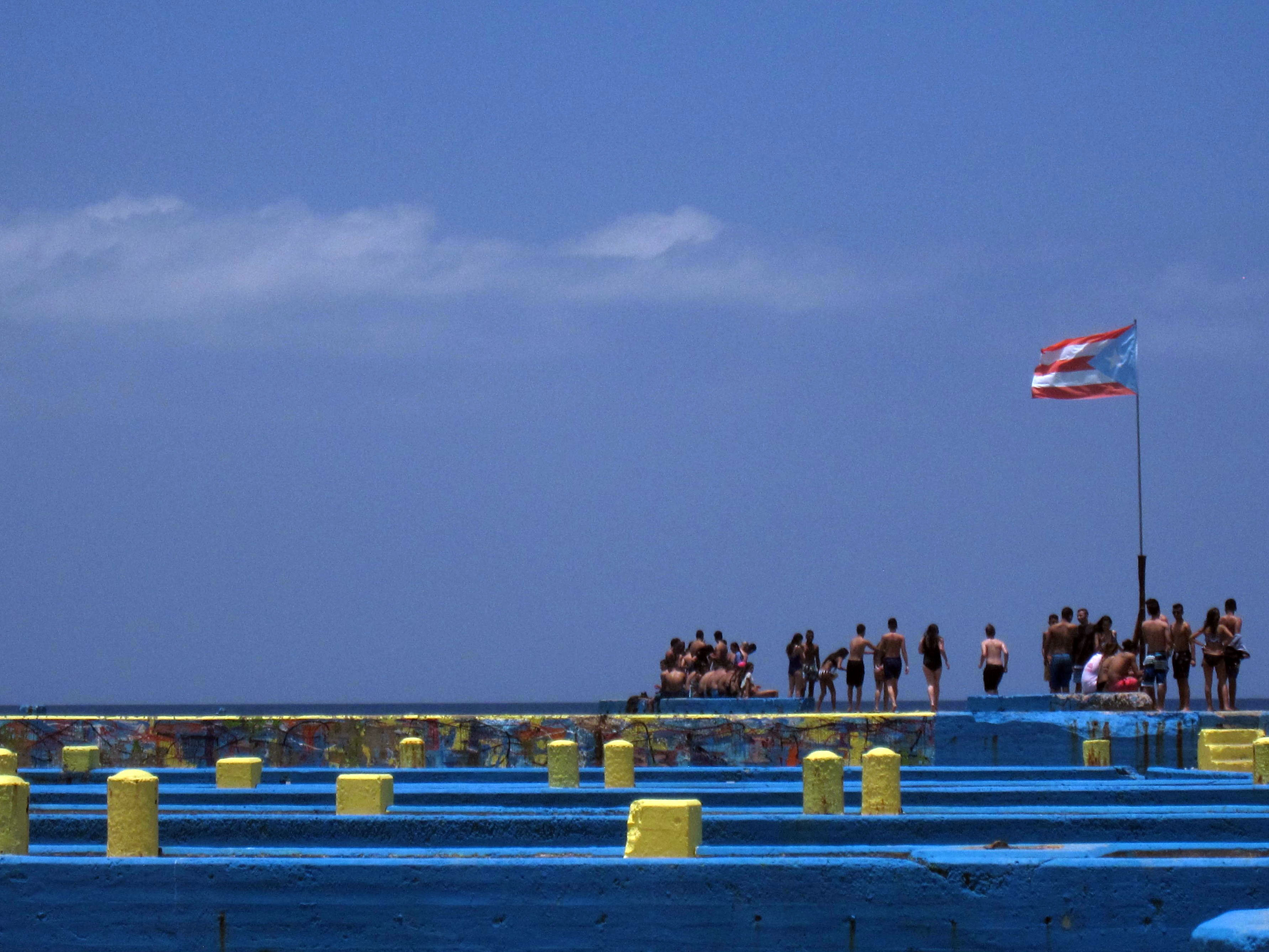
- On the pier at Crash Boat Beach

- Location within Puerto Rico
- Coordinates: 18.458392°N 67.164863°W
- Commonwealth: Puerto Rico
- Municipality: Aguadilla

Crash Boat Beach or Crashboat Beach (Playa Crash Boat) on the northwestern coast of Puerto Rico is situated in the municipality of Aguadilla.

== Description ==
Crash Boat Beach is halfway between the former Ramey Air Force Base (today's Aguadilla Airport) and Aguadilla and still retains some remains of its pier infrastructure from when it was used to support Ramey Air Force Base. Now these piers remains are used as a fishing and recreation spot.

The Crash Boat Beach piers / dock was originally built for use by the United States military rescue boats who raced out to sea to rescue downed airmen from Ramey Air Force Base, hence the name "Crash boat". As time passed, the local sea currents deposited tons of sand into the pier area forming into a beach, making it unusable to dock boats at the pier.

Crash Boat Beach is now a tourism spot where vacationers participate in recreational activities, such as swimming, sun bathing, surfing, and snorkeling.

== Gallery ==
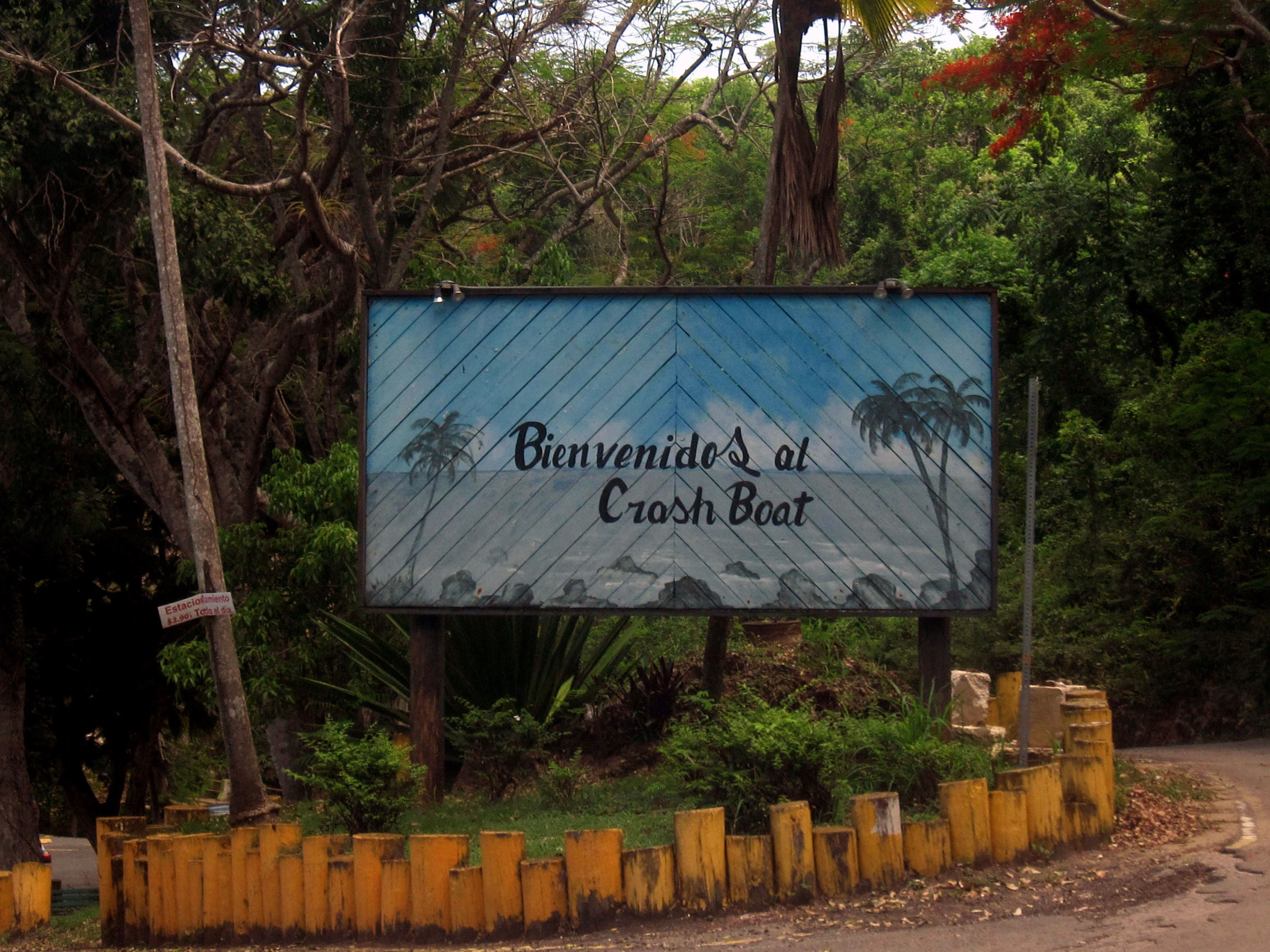
Bienvenidos al Crash Boat sign

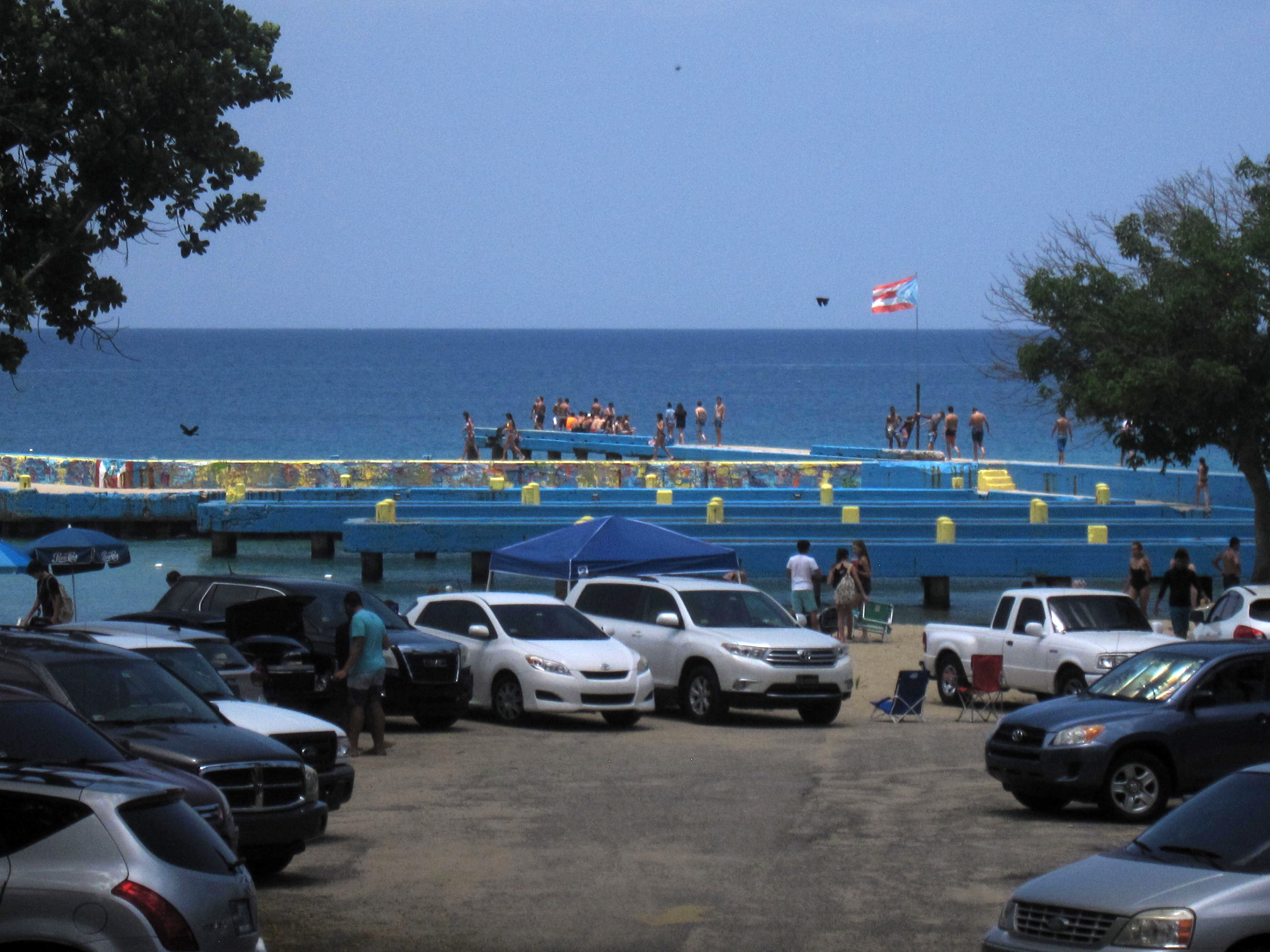
Parking area

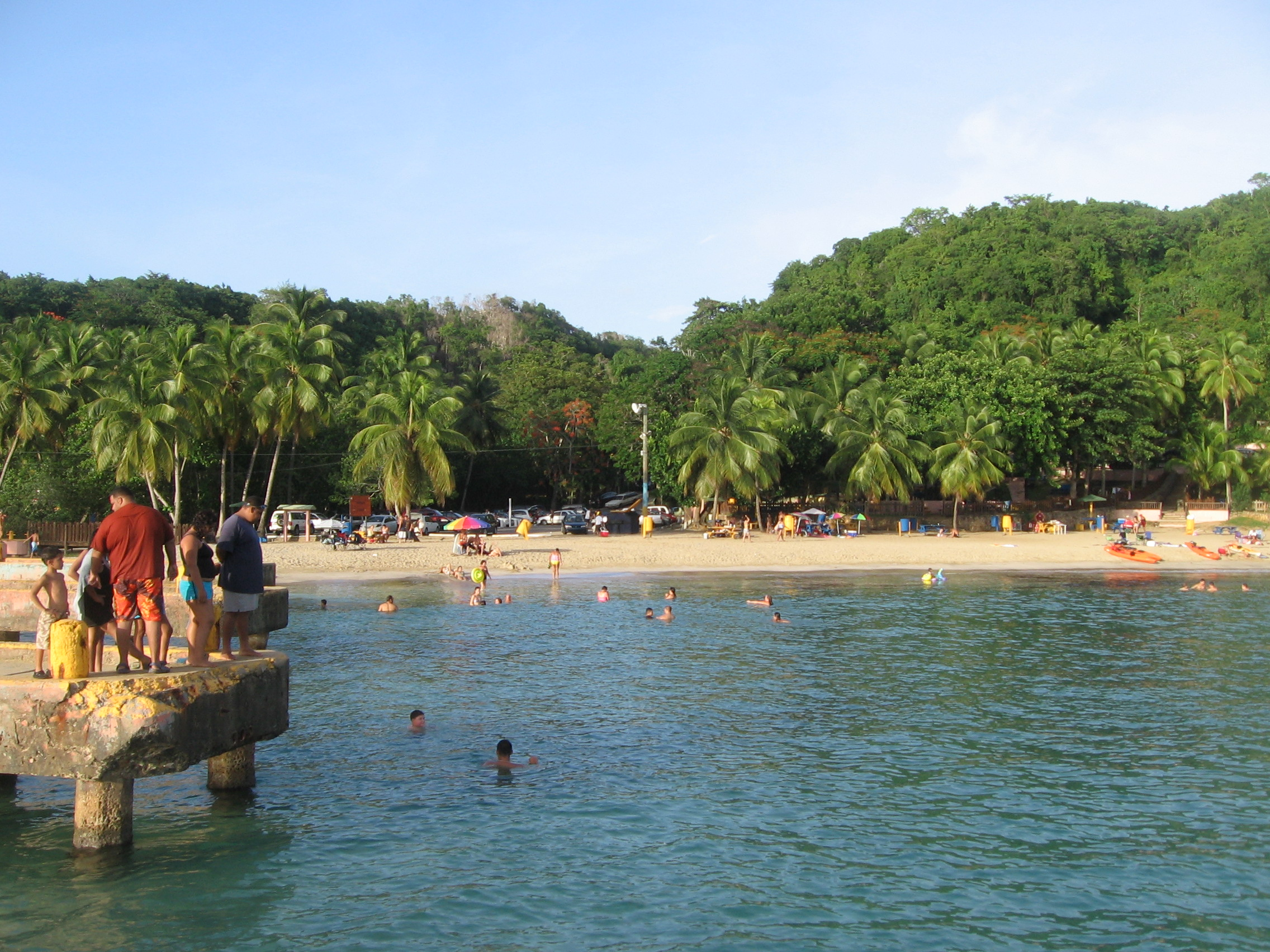
Crash Boat, Summer 2008

Pelicans being fed on Crash Boat

== See also ==
- Flamenco Beach
- La Pocita de Isabela
- List of beaches in Puerto Rico
- Puerto Rico Tourism Company
