= Lime Kiln Hollow =

Valley in Missouri, United States

Coordinates: 36.691389°N 94.191667°W

Lime Kiln Hollow is a valley in McDonald County in the U.S. state of Missouri.

Lime Kiln Hollow was named for the fact a lime kiln once operated in the valley.

== See Also ==
- Geography of Missouri
- Geography of the United States
