= Pigeon Roost Hollow =

Valley in Missouri, United States

Coordinates: 36.629793°N 94.104929°W

Pigeon Roost Hollow is a valley in McDonald County in the U.S. state of Missouri.

Pigeon Roost Hollow was named for the wild pigeons the valley once contained.

== See also ==
- Geography of Missouri
- Geography of the United States
