= Thief Hollow =

Valley in Missouri, United States

Coordinates: 36.639794°N 94.427438°W

Thief Hollow is a valley in McDonald County in the U.S. state of Missouri.

The rustlers that were known to frequent the valley inspired the name 'Thief Hollow'.

== See also ==
- Geography of Missouri
- Geography of the United States
