= Hambrich Hollow =

Valley in Missouri, United States

Coordinates: 36.6231281°N 94.3307687°W

Hambrich Hollow (also called Hambrick Hollow) is a valley in McDonald County in the U.S. state of Missouri.

Some say Hambrich Hollow was named after the local pioneer family, while Lewis Kelley said the valley name was based on a thief named Brick stealing a ham there.

== See also ==
- Geography of Missouri
- Geography of the United States
