= List of beaches in the United States =

The following is list of beaches in the U.S. states, the District of Columbia, and the U.S. territories.

Beaches occur both on the ocean shoreline and inland on lakes, rivers, etc. This list is organized by major coastline. States with large numbers of beaches are listed on linked subarticles.

== Mainland Atlantic states and federal ==
=== Massachusetts ===
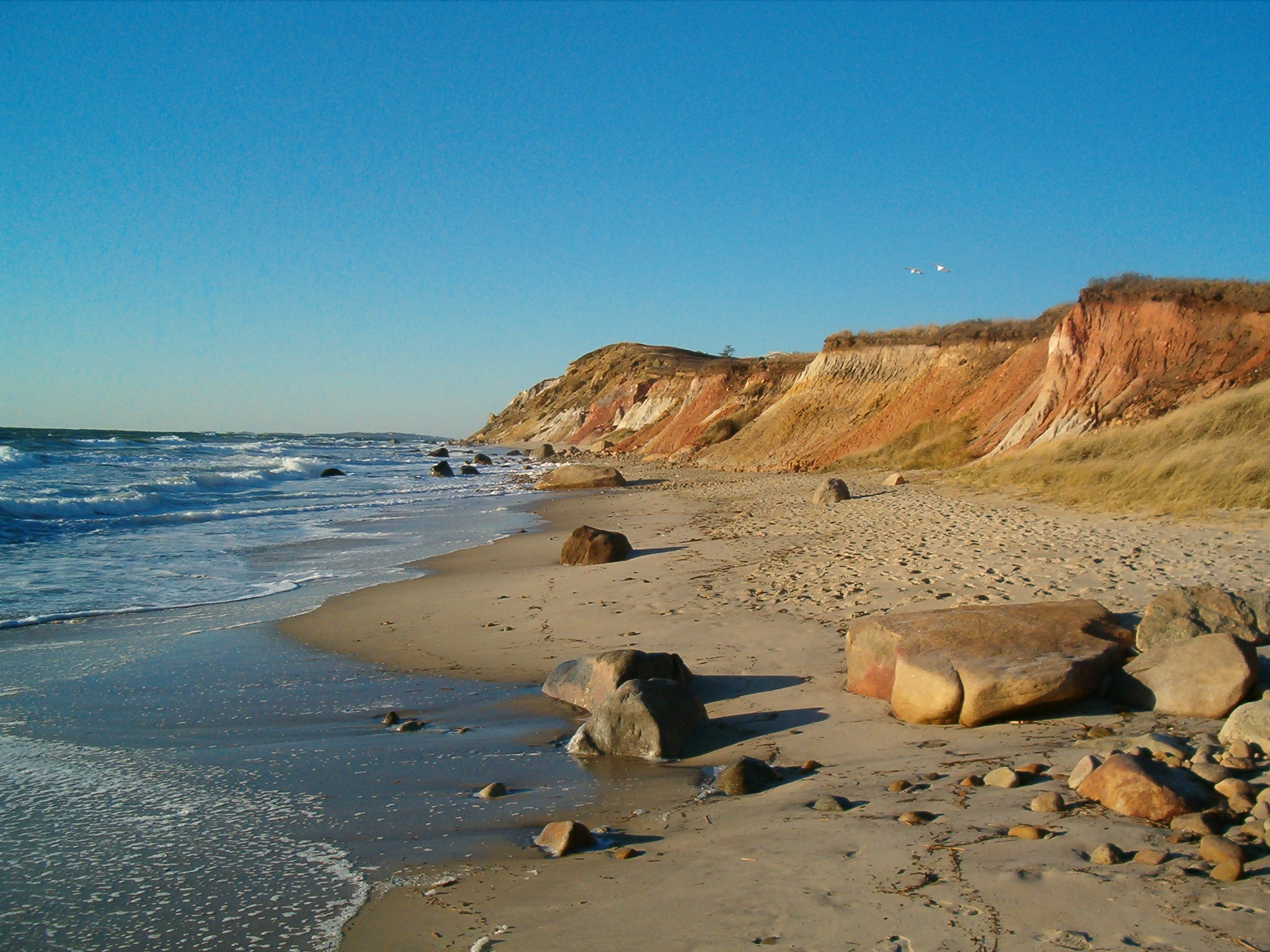
Gay Head Cliffs in Martha's Vineyard, Massachusetts

=== New York ===
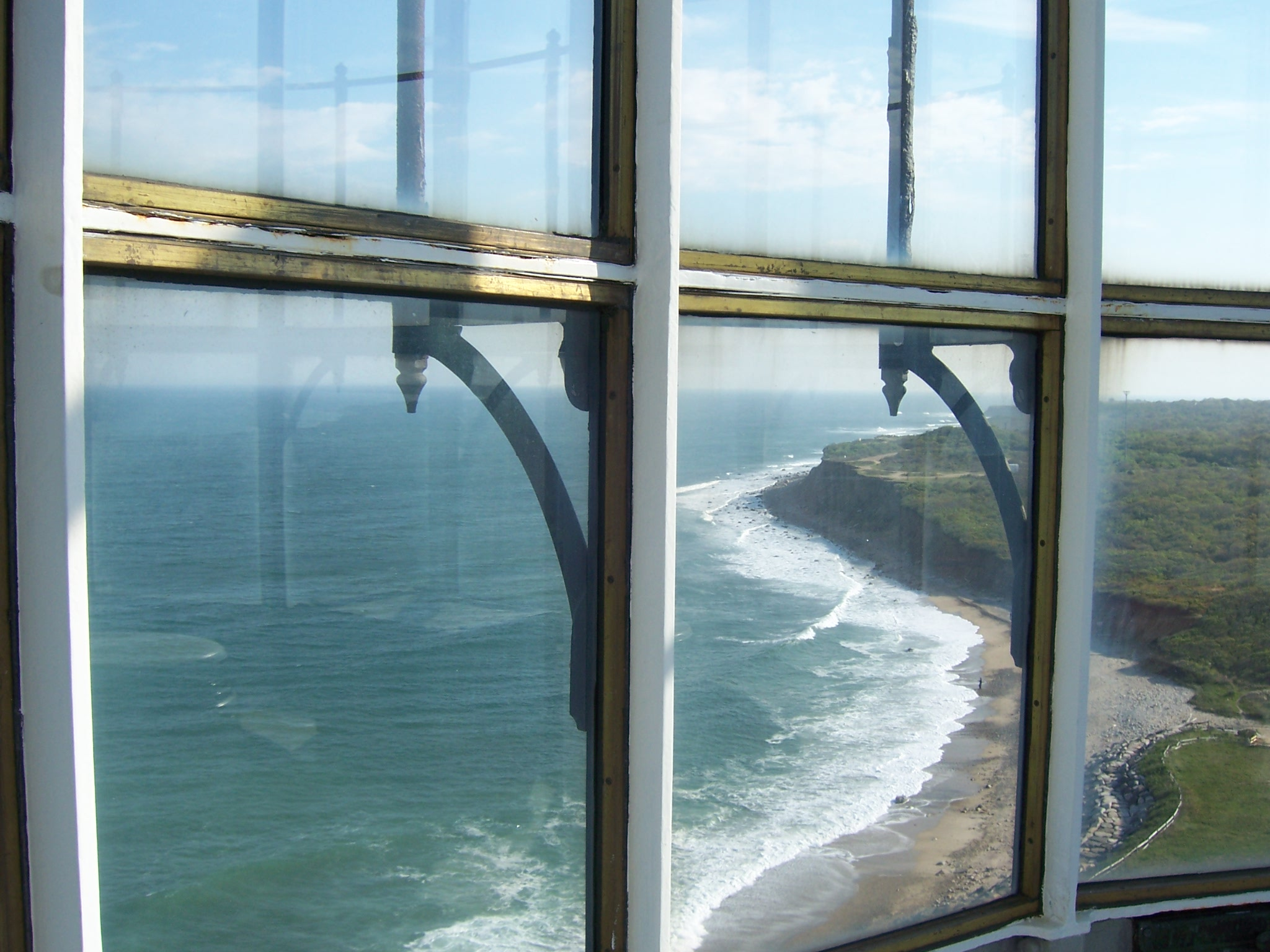
Montauk, Long Island

=== New Jersey ===
- Allenhurst
- Asbury Park
- Atlantic City
- Avalon
- Avon-by-the-Sea
- Barnegat Light
- Bay Head
- Beach Haven
- Belmar
- Bradley Beach
- Brick
- Brigantine
- Cape May
- Cape May Point
- Corson's Inlet State Park (Strathmere)
- Deal
- Gunnison Beach
- Harvey Cedars
- Island Beach State Park (Berkeley Twp.)
- Keansburg
- Lavallette
- Loch Arbour
- Long Beach
- Long Branch
- Longport
- Manasquan
- Mantoloking
- Margate City
- Monmouth Beach
- North Wildwood
- Ocean City
- Ocean Grove (Neptune)
- Ortley Beach (Toms River)
- Point Pleasant Beach
- Sandy Hook (Highlands)
- Sea Bright
- Sea Girt
- Sea Isle City
- Seaside Heights
- Seaside Park
- Seven Presidents Oceanfront Park (Long Branch)
- Ship Bottom
- Spring Lake
- Stone Harbor
- Strathmere (Upper Twp.)
- Surf City
- Ventnor City
- Villas (Lower Twp.)
- Union Beach
- West Wildwood
- Wildwood
- Wildwood Crest

=== District of Columbia ===
The District of Columbia does not currently have a true beach; several areas (such as Georgetown Waterfront Park) have boundaries along the Potomac River, but lack a true beach. From 1914 to 1925, there was a beach at the District of Columbia’s Tidal Basin.

=== Maryland ===
- Ocean City
- Assateague Island

=== Virginia ===
- Buckroe Beach
- Chincoteague
- Colonial Beach
- Ocean View
- Virginia Beach
- Bhutto Beach

=== North Carolina ===
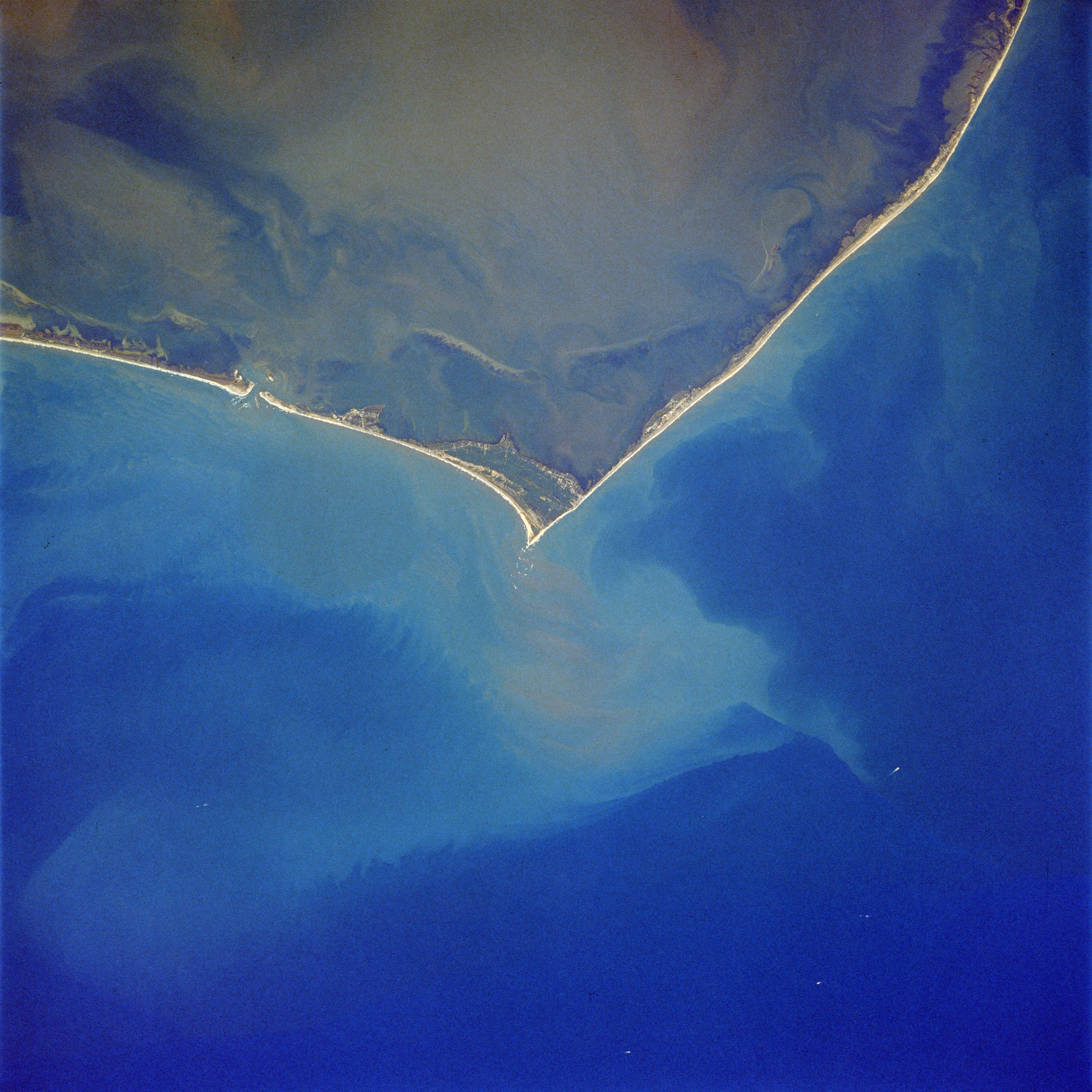
Cape Hatteras from space, still showing sediment displaced by Hurricane Hugo, October 1989

- Atlantic Beach
- Avon
- Buxton
- Cape Hatteras
- Carolina Beach
- Caswell Beach
- Corolla
- Duck
- Emerald Isle
- Holden Beach
- Indian Beach
- Kure Beach
- Long Beach
- Hatteras
- Nags Head
- North Topsail Beach
- Oak Island
- Ocean Isle Beach
- Ocracoke
- Pine Knoll Shores
- Portsmouth
- Rodanthe
- Salter Path
- Salvo
- Southern Shores
- Sunset Beach
- Surf City
- Waves
- Wrightsville Beach
- Yaupon Beach

=== South Carolina ===
- Atlantic Beach
- Cherry Grove Beach
- Edisto Beach
- Folly Beach
- Garden City
- Hilton Head Island
- Isle of Palms
- Kiawah Island
- Litchfield Beach
- Myrtle Beach
- North Myrtle Beach
- Pawleys Island
- Seabrook Island
- Springmaid Beach
- Sullivan's Island
- Surfside Beach

=== Georgia ===
- Cumberland Island
- Jekyll Island
- St. Simons Island
- Sapelo Island
- Sea Island
- Tybee Island

=== Florida ===
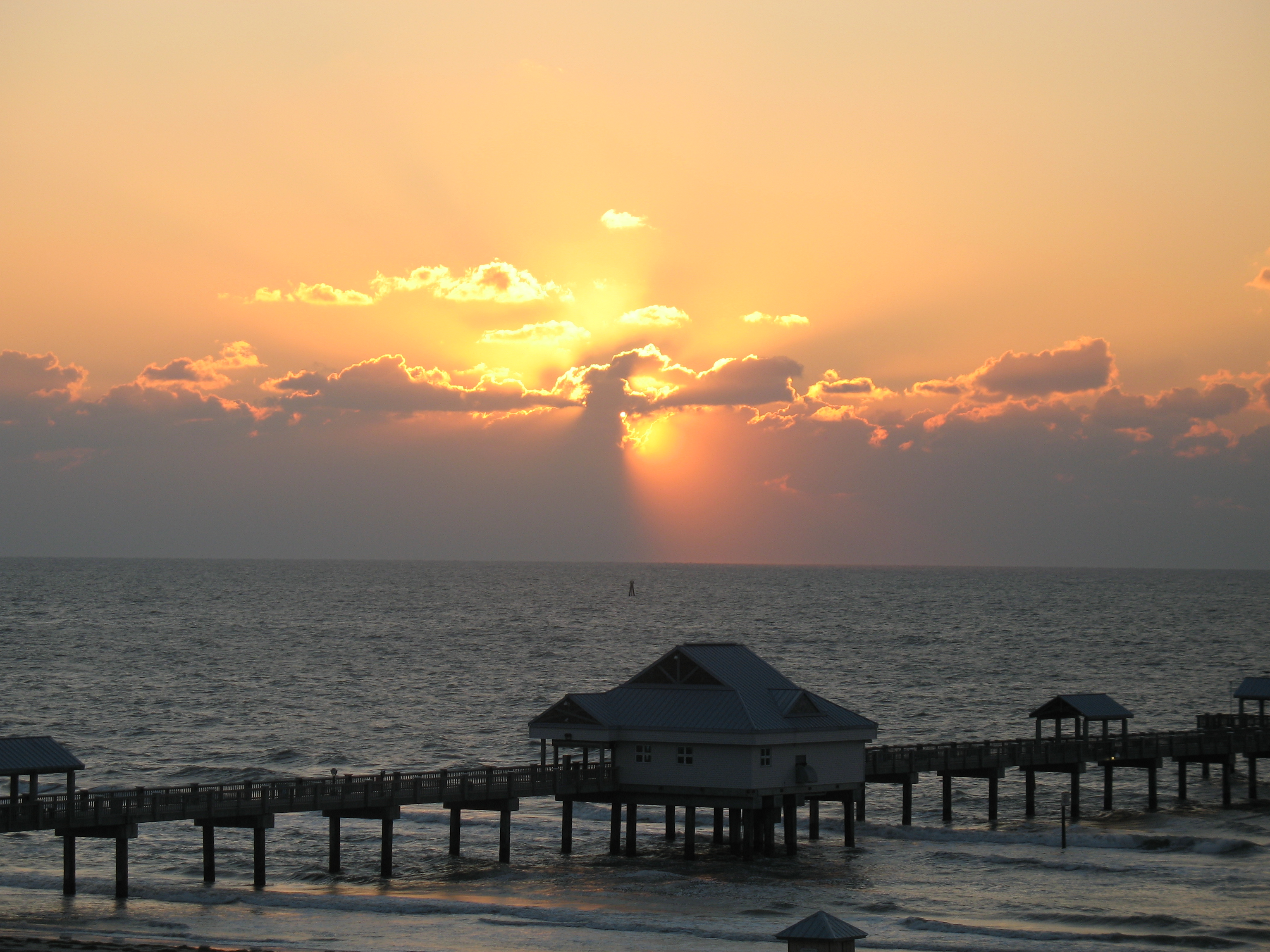
St. Pete Beach sunset

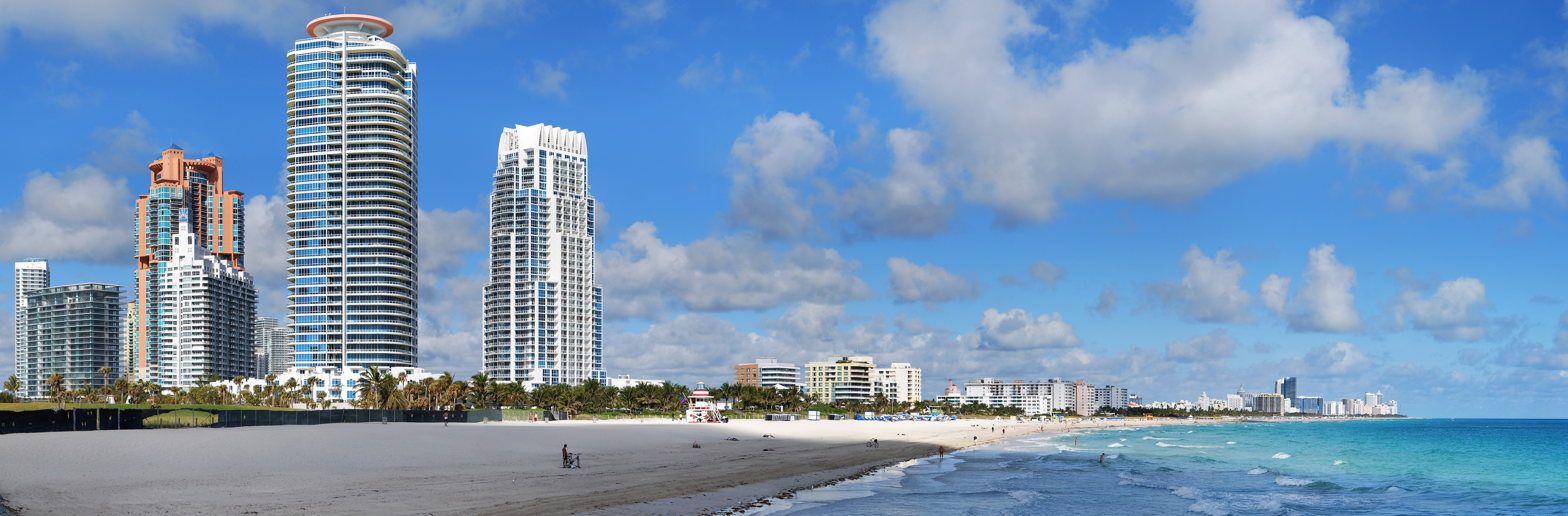
South Beach in Miami, Florida

- Atlantic Beach
- Bahia Honda Key
- Beverly Beach
- Boca Chica
- Boca Raton
- Boynton Beach
- Butler Beach
- Clearwater Beach
- Cocoa Beach
- Crandon Park
- Crescent Beach
- Dania Beach
- Daytona Beach
- Deerfield Beach
- Destin
- Fernandina Beach
- Flagler Beach
- Fort Island Gulf Beach
- Fort Lauderdale
- Fort Myers Beach
- Fort Walton Beach
- Grayton Beach
- Gulf Breeze
- Gulf Stream
- Hallandale Beach
- Haulover Park
- Highland Beach
- Hillsboro Beach
- Hobe Sound
- Hollywood
- Hollywood Beach
- Holmes Beach
- Indian Harbour Beach
- Indian River Shores
- Indian Rocks Beach
- Indiatlantic
- Islamorada
- Jacksonville Beach
- Jensen Beach
- Juno Beach
- Jupiter
- Key Biscayne
- Key Largo
- Key West
- Lake Worth
- Madeira Beach
- Marathon
- Marco Island
- Melbourne Beach
- Miami Beach
- Mid-Beach
- Miramar Beach
- Naples
- Navarre Beach
- Neptune Beach
- New Smyrna Beach
- North Beach
- North Palm Beach
- Orchid
- Ormond Beach
- Palm Beach
- Palm Beach Shores
- Palm Coast
- Panama City Beach
- Pensacola Beach
- Perdido Key
- Pompano Beach
- Ponce Inlet
- Ponte Verda Beach
- Riviera Beach
- Santa Rosa Beach
- Sarasota
- Satellite Beach
- Seaside
- Siesta Key Beach
- Smathers Beach
- Sombrero Beach
- South Beach
- St. Augustine Beach
- St. George Island Beach
- St. Pete Beach
- Stuart
- Sunny Isles Beach
- Tigertail Beach
- Vanderbilt Beach
- Vero Beach
- Vilano Beach
- Virginia Key
- Wabasso Beach
- Watercolor
- West Palm Beach
- John C. Beasley Park

== Gulf of Mexico states ==
(east to west, excluding Florida)

=== Alabama ===
- Dauphin Island
- Gulf Shores
- Orange Beach
- Fairhope
- Fort Morgan

=== Mississippi ===
- Biloxi
- Gulfport
- Long Beach
- Ocean Springs
- Pascagoula
- Pass Christian
- Bay Saint Louis
- Waveland
- Ship Island, Mississippi
- Horn Island
- Petit Bois Island
- Cat Island, Mississippi

=== Louisiana ===
- Grand Isle
- Holly Beach
- Chandeleur Islands
- Cypremort Point State Park

=== Texas ===
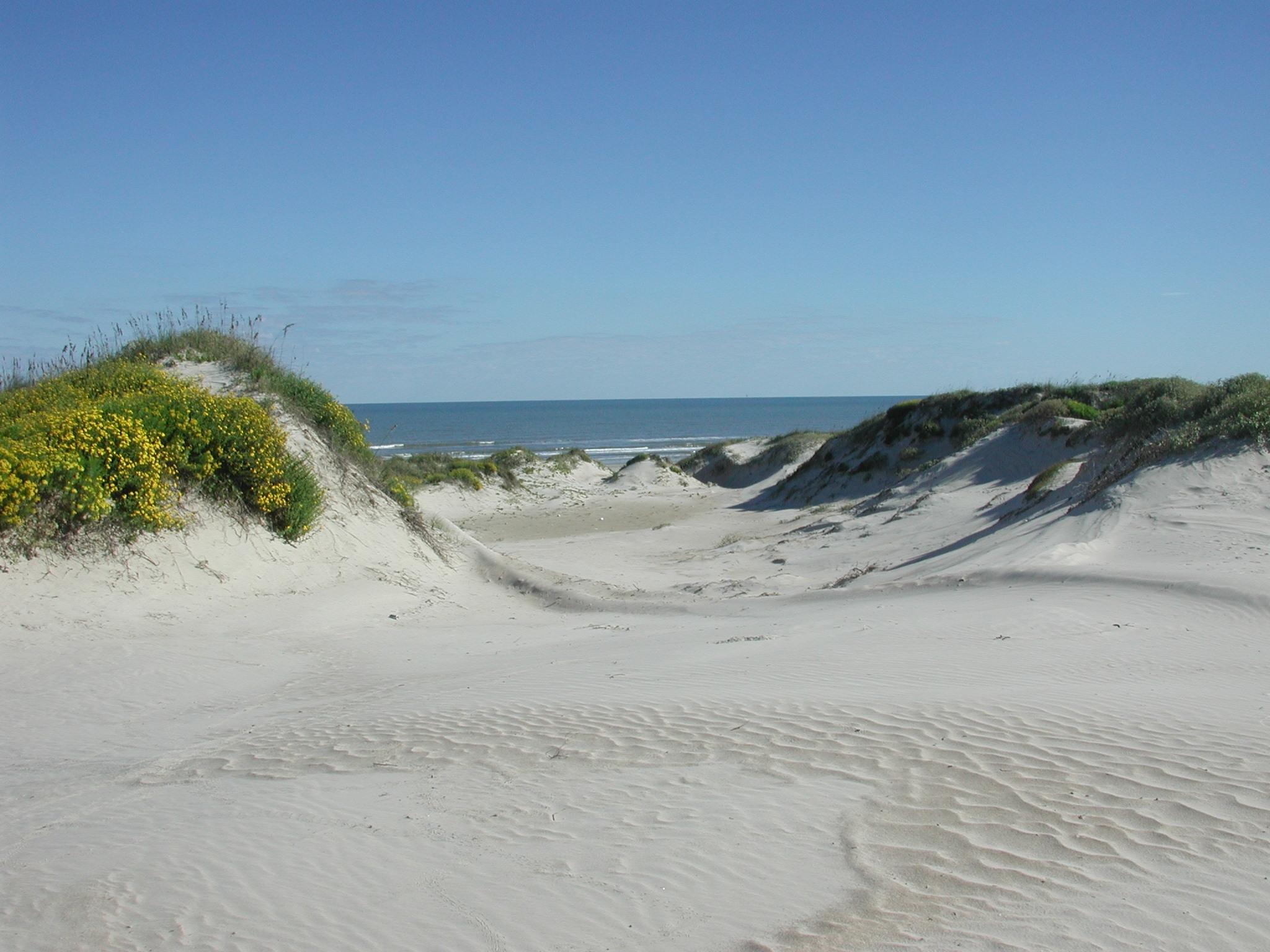
Padre Island National Seashore, Texas

- Galveston
- Mustang Island
- Padre Island
- South Padre Island
- Surfside Beach

== Mainland Pacific states ==
(northwest to southeast)

=== Alaska ===
- Bishop’s Beach
- Black Sand Beach (Barry Arm)
- Goose Lake (Anchorage)
- Kincaid Beach
- Nome Beach
- Nunathloogagamiutbingoi Dunes
- Summer Bay Beach

=== Washington ===
- Alki Beach
- Ocean Shores

=== Oregon ===
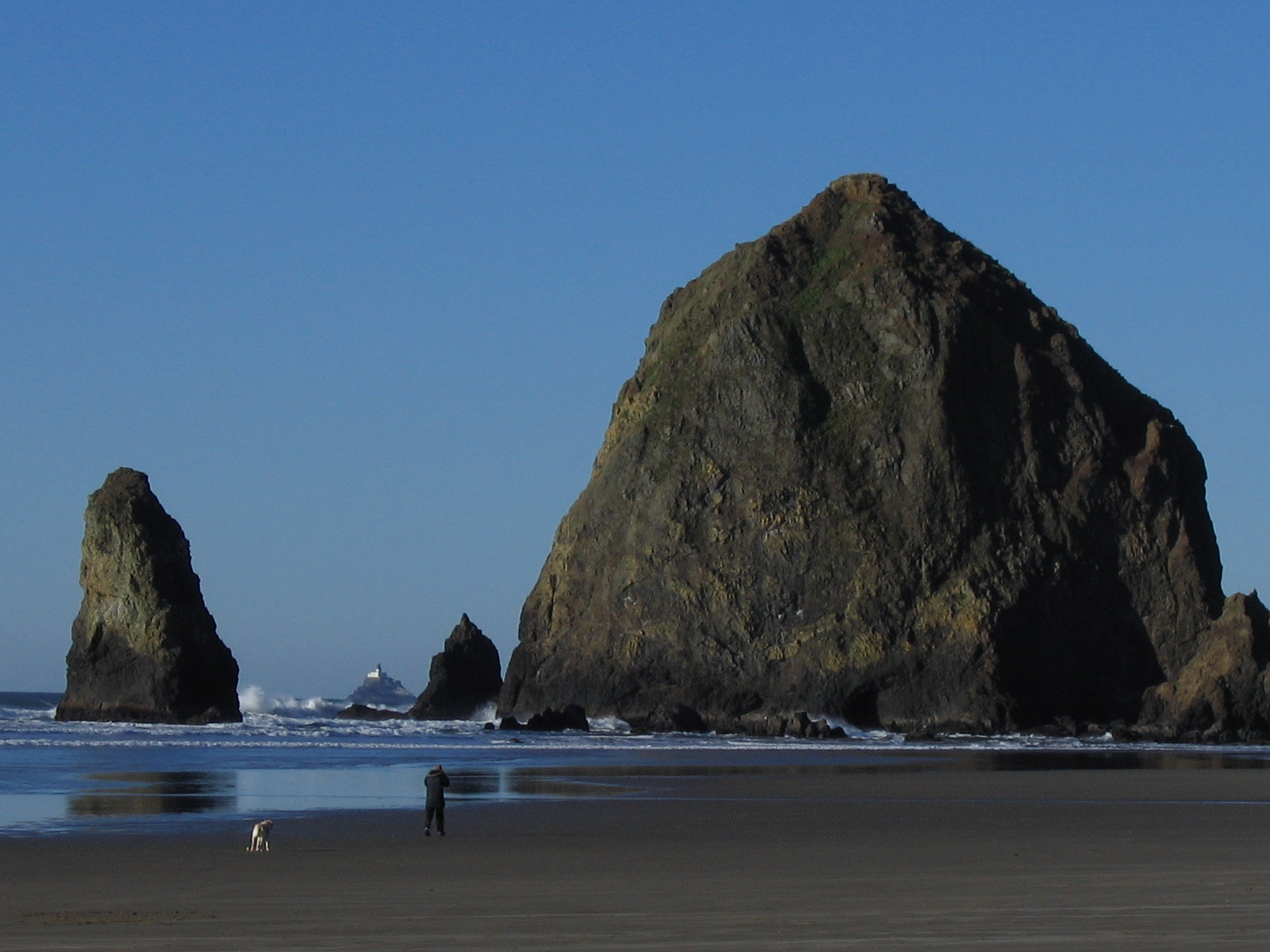
Oregon Coast at Cannon Beach

=== California ===
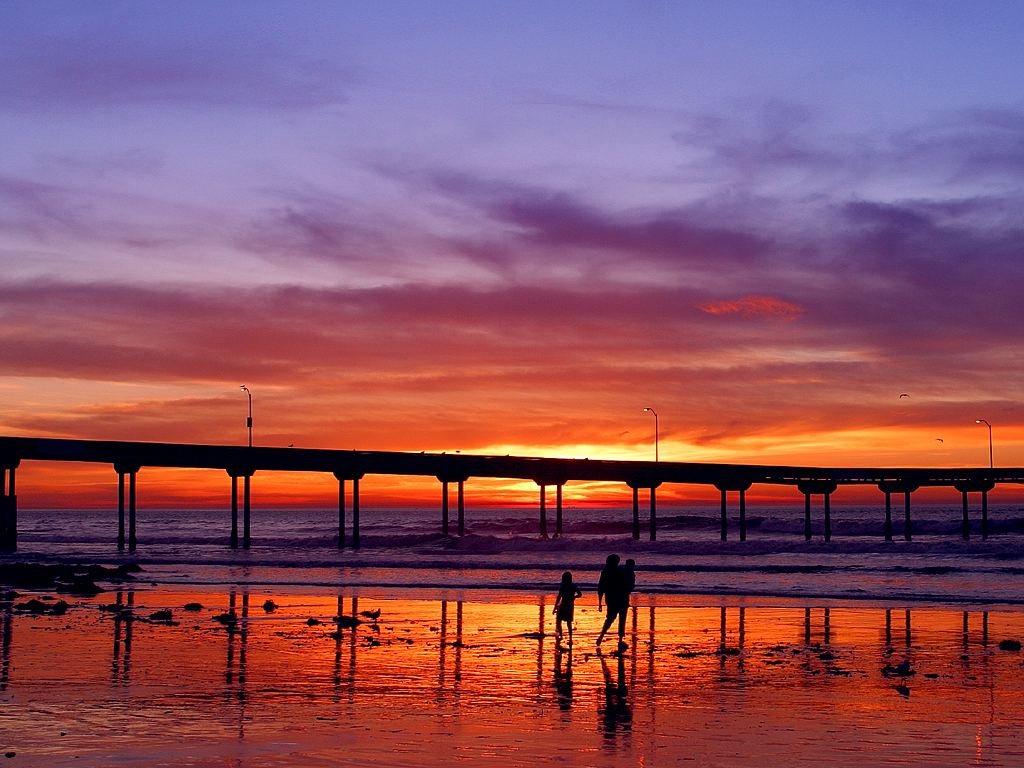
Ocean Beach Pier, San Diego

== Island states and territories ==
=== American Samoa ===
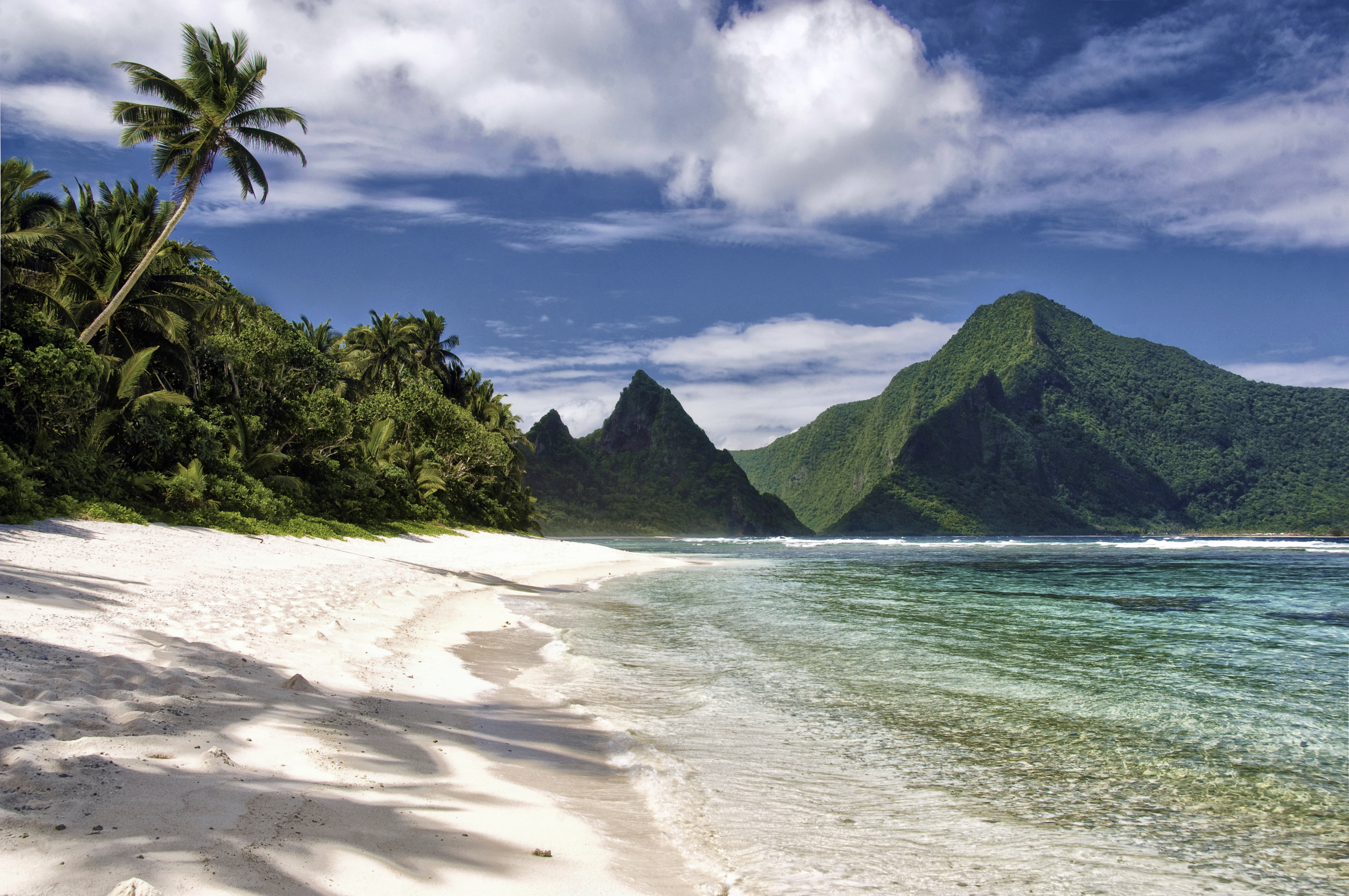
Ofu Beach on Ofu Island in American Samoa (National Park of American Samoa)

- Alao Beach & Tula Beach
- Alega Beach
- Aunu’u Beach
- Faleasao Beach
- Freddie’s Beach
- Ofu Beach
- Palagi Beach
- Sa’ilele Beach
- Two-Dollar Beach (Avaio Beach)
- Utulei Beach Park
- Vatia Beach

=== Guam ===
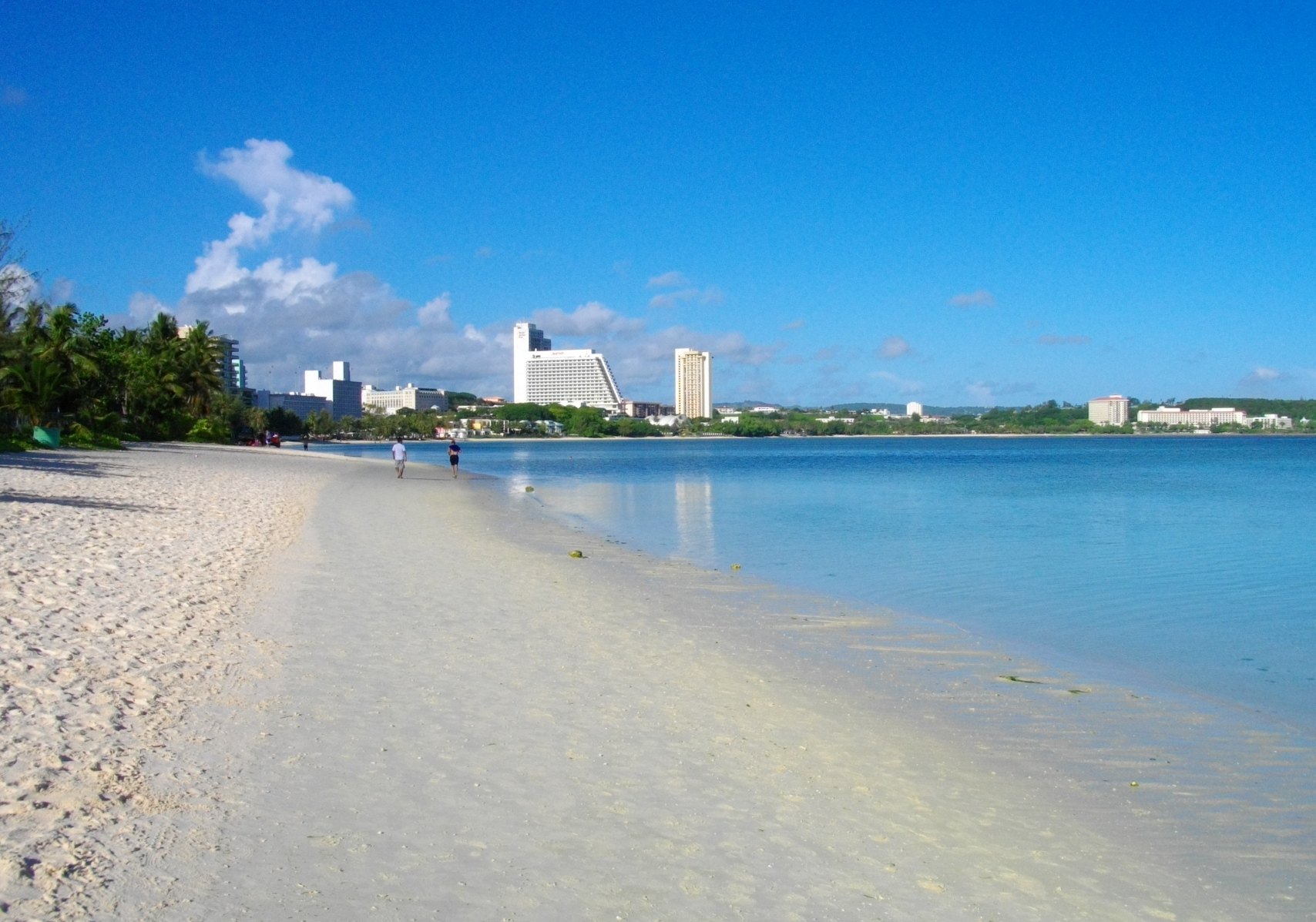
Tumon Beach, Guam

- Agat Invasion Beach
- Asan Beach
- Dadi Beach
- Faifai Beach
- First Beach
- Gab Gab Beach
- Gun Beach
- Haputo Beach
- Ipan Beach
- Mushroom Rock Hilaan Beach
- Ritidian Beach
- Shark Cove Beach
- Tagachang Beach
- Talofofo Beach (Surf Side Beach / Black Sand Beach)
- Tanguisson Beach
- Tumon Beach
- Ypao Beach

=== Hawaii ===
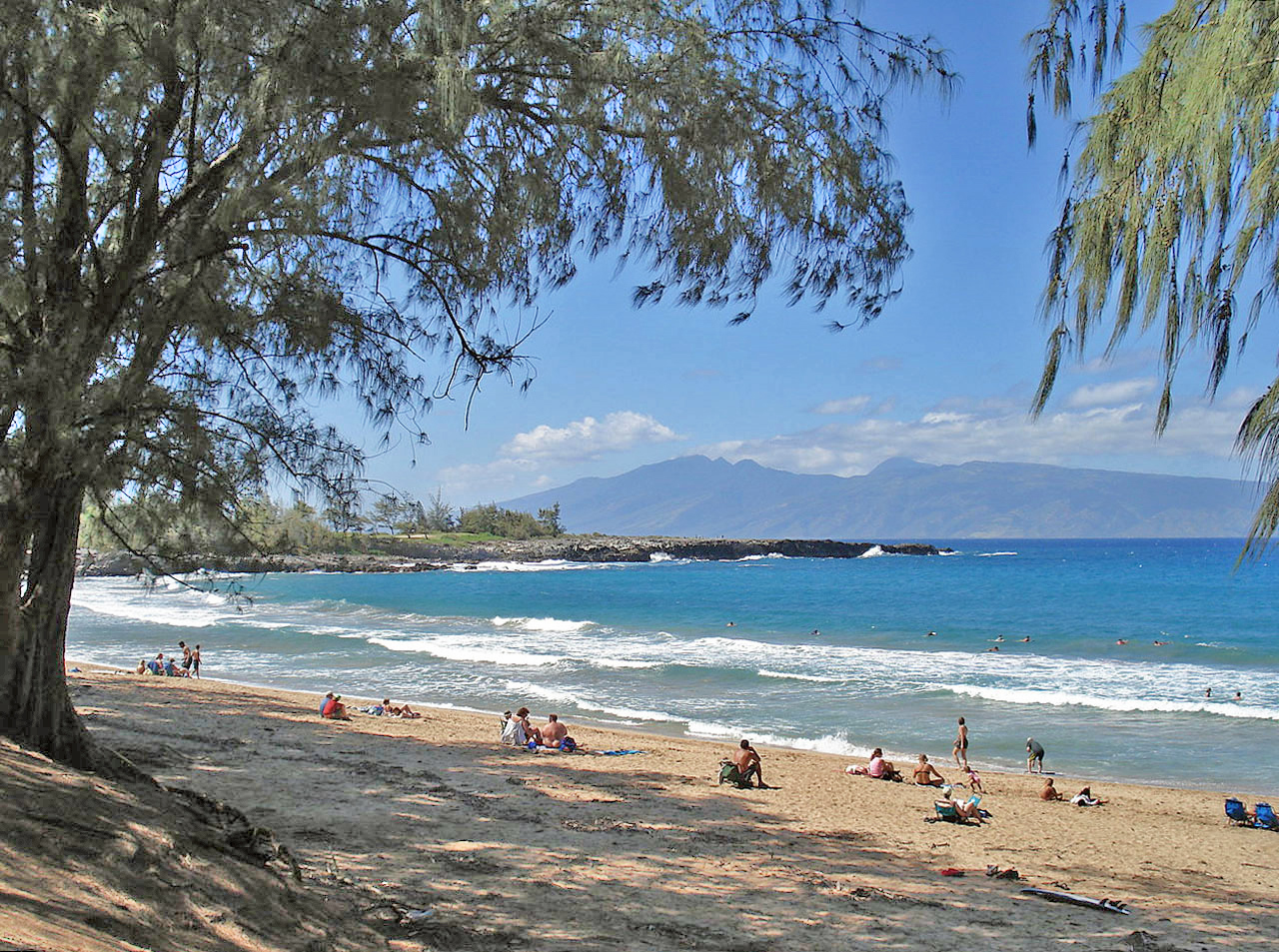
D.T. Fleming Beach, Maui, Hawaii

- D.T. Fleming Beach, Maui
- Kee Beach, Kauai
- Hanauma Bay Nature Preserve, Oahu
- Hapuna Beach State Recreation Area, Hawaii Island
- Kaanapali Beach, Maui
- Kahulu’u Beach Park, Hawaii Island
- Kailua, Oahu
- Mauna Kea Beach, Hawaii Island
- Kekaha Kai Beach, Hawaii Island
- Lumaha'i Beach
- Green Sands Beach, Hawaii Island
- Punaluʻu Beach (Black Sand Beach), Hawaii Island
- Sunset Beach, Oahu
- Waimea Beach, Oahu
- Waikiki Beach, Oahu

=== Northern Mariana Islands ===
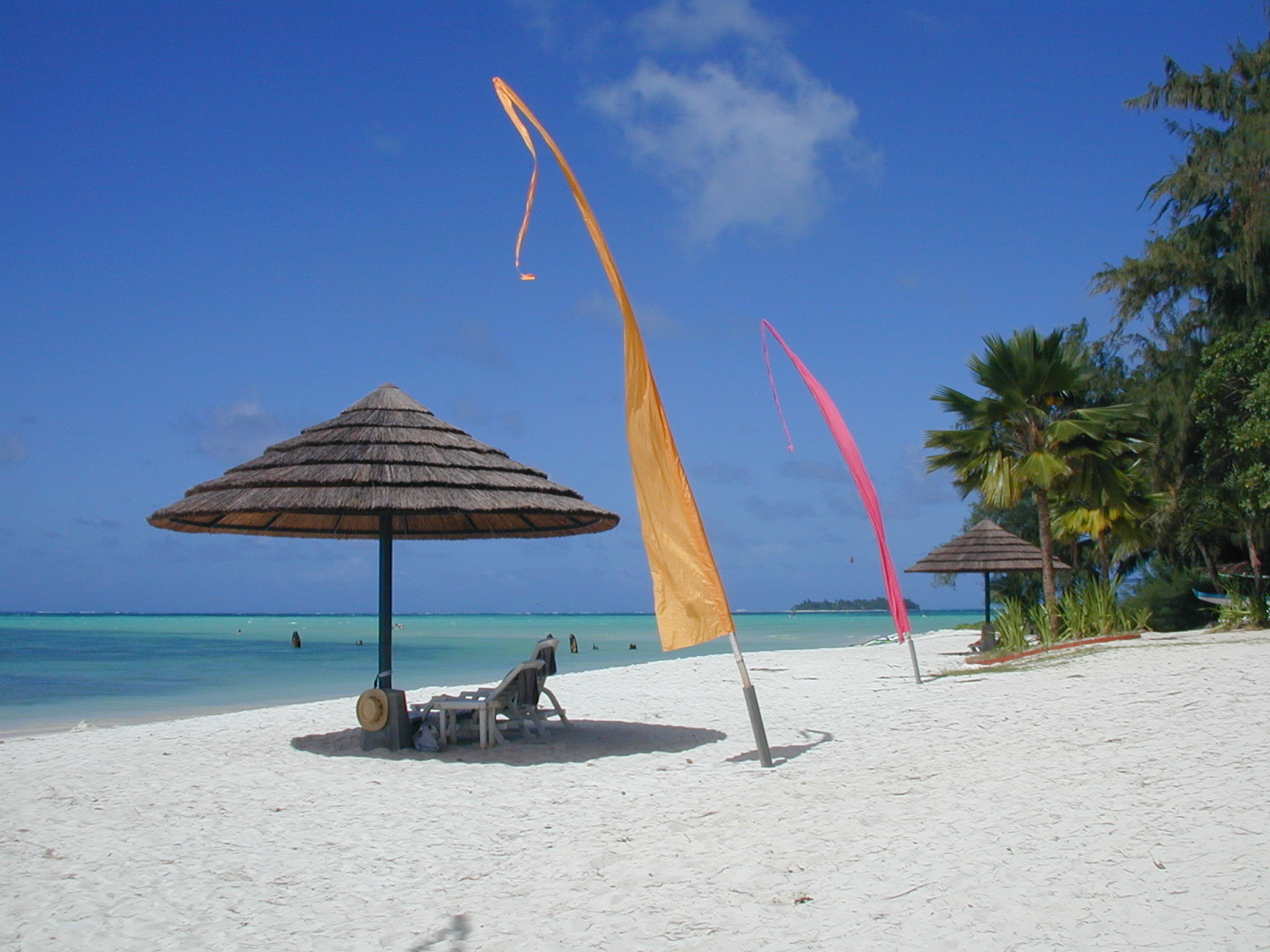
Micro Beach, Saipan, Northern Mariana Islands

- Mañagaha Beach
- Micro Beach
- Obyan Beach
- Pau Pau Beach
- Lam Lam Beach (Tinian)
- Laulau Beach
- Mochong Beach (Rota)
- Tanapag Beach
- Tank Beach
- Tweksberry Beach (Rota)
- Wing Beach

=== Puerto Rico ===
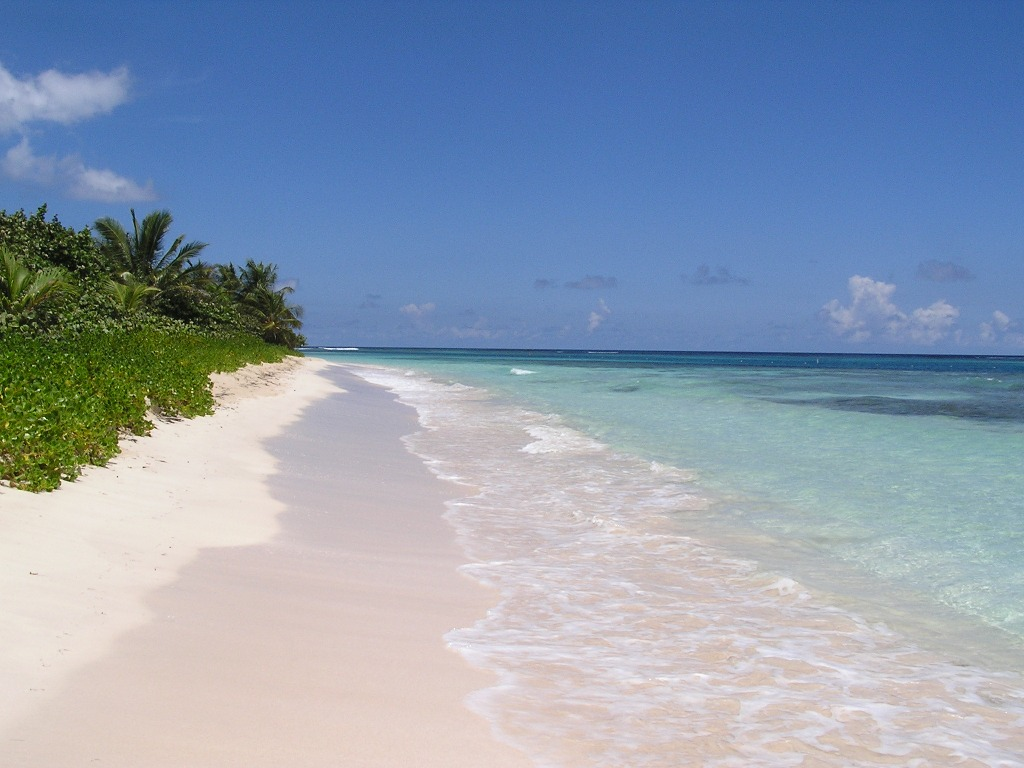
Flamenco Beach in Culebra, Puerto Rico

- Balneario de Rincón
- Boquerón Beach
- Crash Boat Beach
- Domes Beach
- El Tuque
- Flamenco Beach
- La Pocita de las Golondrinas Beach
- Luquillo Beach
- Playa Espinar

=== U.S. Minor Outlying Islands ===
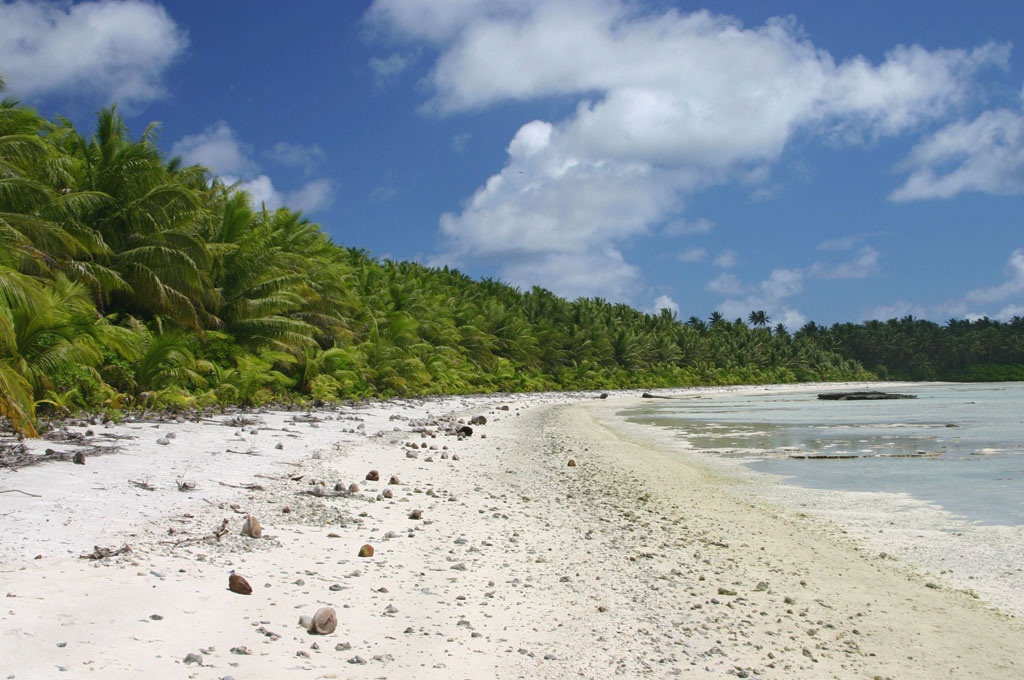
Beach in northern Palmyra Atoll, U.S. Minor Outlying Islands

- Beaches at Midway Atoll
- Beaches at Palmyra Atoll
- Beach ringing Navassa Island

=== U.S. Virgin Islands ===
Magens Bay beach in Saint Thomas, U.S. Virgin Islands

== Great Lakes states ==
(west to east except the Michigan Upper Peninsula)

=== Minnesota ===
- Cedar Lake East Beach
- McCarthy Beach State Park
- Minnesota Point (Park Point)

=== Wisconsin ===
- Bradford Beach
- Mazo Beach
- Point Beach
- Sheboygan North Point Beach
- Door County, Wisconsin § Beaches

=== Illinois ===
- Illinois Beach State Park

=== Indiana ===
- Indiana Dunes National Park
- Whihala Beach County Park

=== Michigan ===
- Duck Lake State Park
- Grand Haven Beach
- Hoffmaster State Park
- Holland Beach
- McLain State Park
- Muskegon Beach
- Orchard Beach
- Pere Marquette Park Beach
- Oval Beach
- Saugatuck Dunes Beach
- Silver Beach County Park
- Sleeping Bear Dunes National Lakeshore
- South Haven Beach
- Van Buren State Park
- Warren Dunes Beach
- Metro Beach

=== Ohio ===
- Cedar Point
- Cleveland Metroparks
- Headlands Beach State Park
- Walnut Beach Park (Ashtabula)

=== Pennsylvania ===
- Erie
- Presque Isle

== Other inland states ==
(alphabetical)

=== Arizona ===
- Lake Havasu State Park beaches

=== Idaho ===
- Bear Lake State Park (North Beach State Park)
- Coeur d’Alene City Park and Beach

=== Montana ===
- Whitefish City Beach
- Whitefish Lake State Park
- NASIK CITY PARK

=== Nevada ===
- Nevada Beach (Lake Tahoe)
- Sand Harbor Beach (Lake Tahoe)
- Whale Beach (Lake Tahoe)

=== New Mexico ===
- Lake Carlsbad Beach Park

=== North Dakota ===
- Beaver Lake State Park beach
- Lake Metigoshe State Park beach

=== Utah ===
- Rendezvous Beach

=== West Virginia ===
- Bee Run Beach (Sutton Lake Marina)
- Shaw Beach (Jennings Randolph Lake)

=== Wyoming ===
- Boysen State Park Beach
- Sandy Beach (Fremont Lake)

== See also ==
- List of beaches
- Lists of landforms of the United States
