= Lists of landforms of the United States =

The United States contains varied landforms across its territory. These include:

- List of beaches in the United States
- List of fjords of the United States
- List of glaciers in the United States
- List of islands of the United States
- List of lakes of the United States
- List of rivers of the United States
- List of volcanoes in the United States
- List of waterfalls of the United States
- Mountain peaks of the United States
  - Appalachian Mountains
  - Black Hills
  - Cascade Range
  - Rocky Mountains
  - List of mountains of the United States
- Northern Rocky Mountains
