= Geography of the United States =

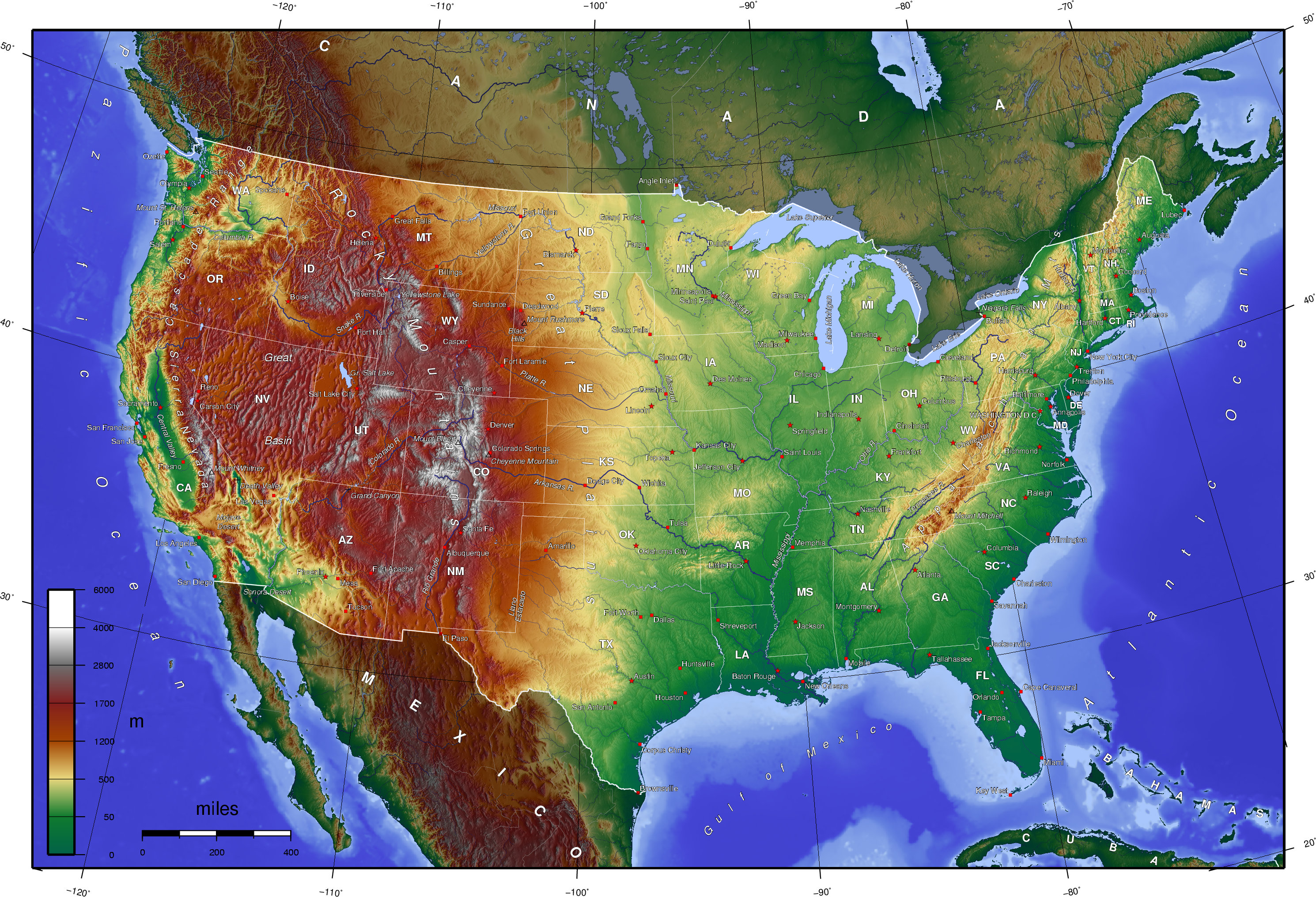
- Continent: North America (except Hawaii and territories)
- Coordinates: 40°N 100°W
- Area: Ranked 3rd/4th
  - Total: 9,866,624 km^{2} (3,809,525 sq mi)
  - Land: 92.72%
  - Water: 7.28%
- Coastline: 19,929 km (12,383 mi)
- Borders: 7,479 mi (12,036 km); Canada: 5,525 mi (8,891 km); Mexico: 1,954 mi (3,145 km)
- Highest point: Denali/Mount McKinley; 20,310 ft (6,190.5 m)
- Lowest point: Badwater Basin (Death Valley), −282 ft (−86 m)
- Longest river: Missouri River, 2,341 mi (3,767 km)
- Largest lake: (shared) Lake Superior; 20,598 sq mi (53,348 km^{2}) (U.S.) (internal) Lake Michigan; 22,300 sq mi (57,757 km^{2})
- Climate: Diverse: Ranges from warm-summer continental in the far north to tropical in the far south. West: mostly semi-arid to desert, Mountains: alpine, Northeast: humid continental, Southeast: humid subtropical, Coast of California: Mediterranean, Pacific Northwest: cool temperate oceanic, Alaska: mostly subarctic, Hawaii, South Florida, and the territories: tropical
- Terrain: Vast central plain, Interior Highlands and low mountains in Midwest, mountains and valleys in the mid-south, coastal flatland near the Gulf and Atlantic coasts, complete with mangrove forests and temperate, subtropical, and tropical laurel forest and jungle, canyons, basins, plateaus, and mountains in west, hills and low mountains in east; intermittent hilly and mountainous regions in Great Plains, with occasional badland topography; rugged mountains and broad river valleys in Alaska; rugged, volcanic topography in Hawaii and the territories
- Natural resources: Coal, copper, lead, molybdenum, phosphates, rare earth elements, uranium, bauxite, gold, iron, mercury, nickel, potash, silver, tungsten, zinc, petroleum, natural gas, timber, arable land
- Natural hazards: Tsunamis; volcanoes; earthquake activity around Pacific Basin; hurricanes along the Atlantic and Gulf of Mexico coasts; severe convective thunderstorms and tornadoes in the Mideast, Great Plains and Southeast; mud slides in California; forest and brush fires in the west and central regions, especially; flooding; dust storms in western and central regions; permafrost in northern Alaska
- Environmental issues: Environmental issues Deforestation, energy irresponsibility, pollution, nuclear waste, Severe water shortages, air pollution resulting in acid rain in both the US and Canada
- Exclusive economic zone: 4,383,000 mi^{2} (11,351,000 km^{2})

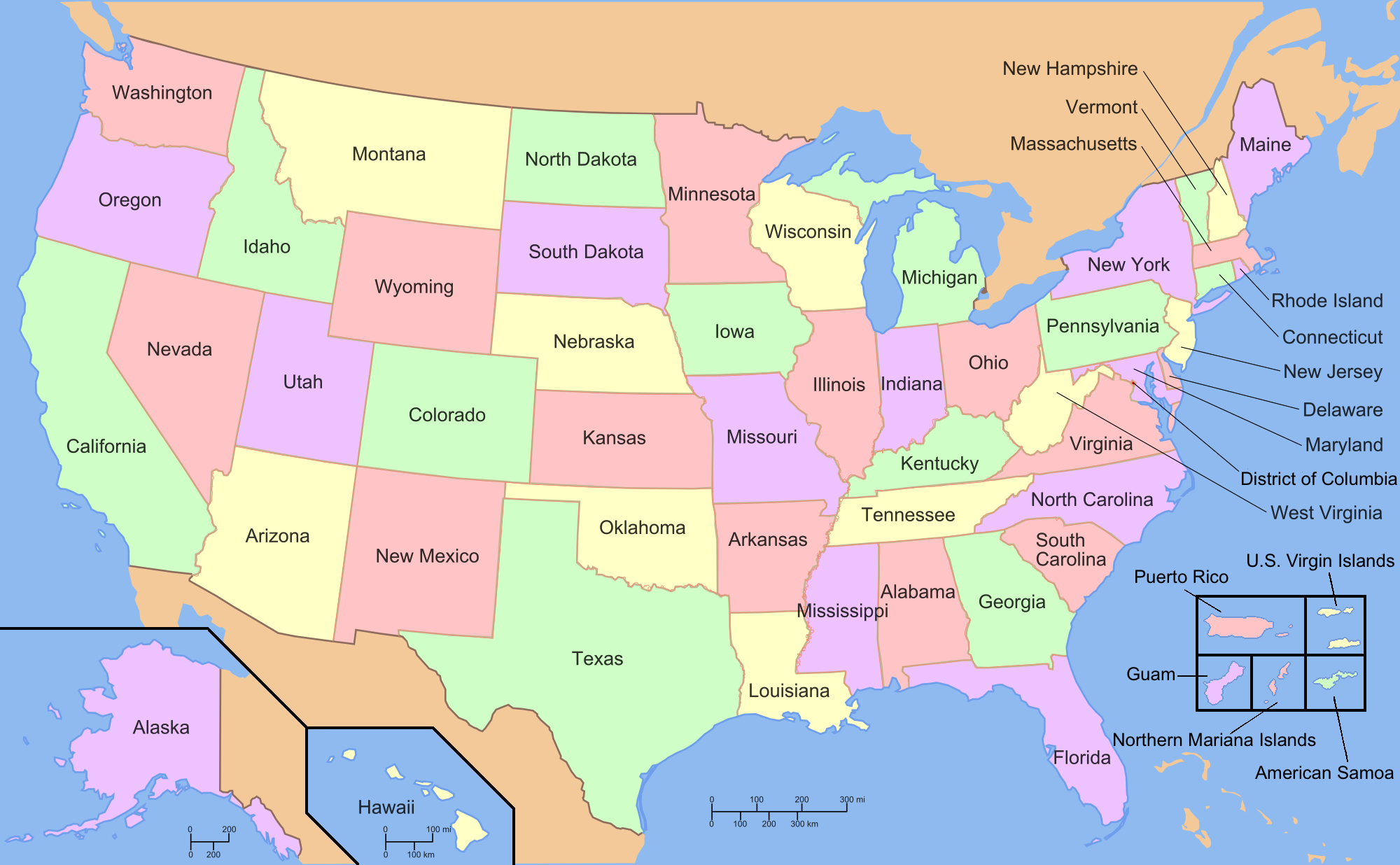
A political map of the United States showing the 50 states, the national capital of Washington, D.C., and the five major U.S. territories. (Note: Areas not on the map: Aleutian Islands (Alaska); Northwest Hawaiian Islands (Hawaii); Mona Island (Puerto Rico); Rota and Northern Islands Municipality (Northern Mariana Islands); Manu'a Islands, Rose Atoll and Swains Island (American Samoa) and the U.S. Minor Outlying Islands)

The term "United States", when used in the geographic sense, refers to the contiguous United States (sometimes referred to as the Lower 48, including the District of Columbia not as a state), Alaska, Hawaii, the five insular territories of Puerto Rico, Northern Mariana Islands, U.S. Virgin Islands, Guam, American Samoa, and minor outlying possessions. The United States shares land borders with Canada and Mexico and maritime borders with Russia, Cuba, the Bahamas, and a few other countries, mainly in the Caribbean, (Note: The United States has a maritime border with the United Kingdom because the U.S. Virgin Islands borders the British Virgin Islands. Puerto Rico has a maritime border with the Dominican Republic. American Samoa has a maritime border with the Cook Islands (see Cook Islands–United States Maritime Boundary Treaty). American Samoa also has maritime borders with independent Samoa and Niue.) in addition to Canada and Mexico. The northern border of the United States with Canada is the world's longest bi-national land border.

The state of Hawaii is physiographically and ethnologically part of the Polynesian subregion of Oceania. U.S. territories are located in the Pacific Ocean and the Caribbean.

== Area ==
From 1989 through 1996, the total area of the US was listed as 3,618,780 square miles (9,372,610 km^{2}) (land and inland water only). The listed total area changed to 3,717,813 sq mi (9,629,091 km^{2}) in 1997 (Great Lakes area and coastal waters added), to 3,718,711 sq mi (9,631,418 km^{2}) in 2004, to 3,718,710 sq mi (9,631,420 km^{2}) in 2006, and to 3,794,080 sq mi (9,826,630 km^{2}) in 2007 (territorial waters added). As of 2026, the CIA World Factbook gives 3,796,742 sq mi (9,833,517 km^{2}), the United Nations Statistics Division gives 3,717,813 sq mi (9,629,091 km^{2}), and the Encyclopedia Britannica gives 3,677,649 sq mi (9,525,067 km^{2}) (Great Lakes area included but not coastal and territorial waters). These sources consider only the 50 states and the Federal District and exclude overseas territories. The US has the 2nd-largest Exclusive Economic Zone of 4,383,000 sq mi (11,351,000 km^{2}).

By total area (water as well as land), the United States is either slightly larger or smaller than the People's Republic of China, making it the world's third or fourth-largest country. Both countries are smaller than Canada and Canada in total area but are larger than Brazil. By land area only (exclusive of waters), the United States is the world's third largest country, after Russia and China, with Canada in fourth. Whether the US or China is the third largest country by total area depends on two factors: (1) the validity of China's claim on Aksai Chin and Trans-Karakoram Tract

== General characteristics ==
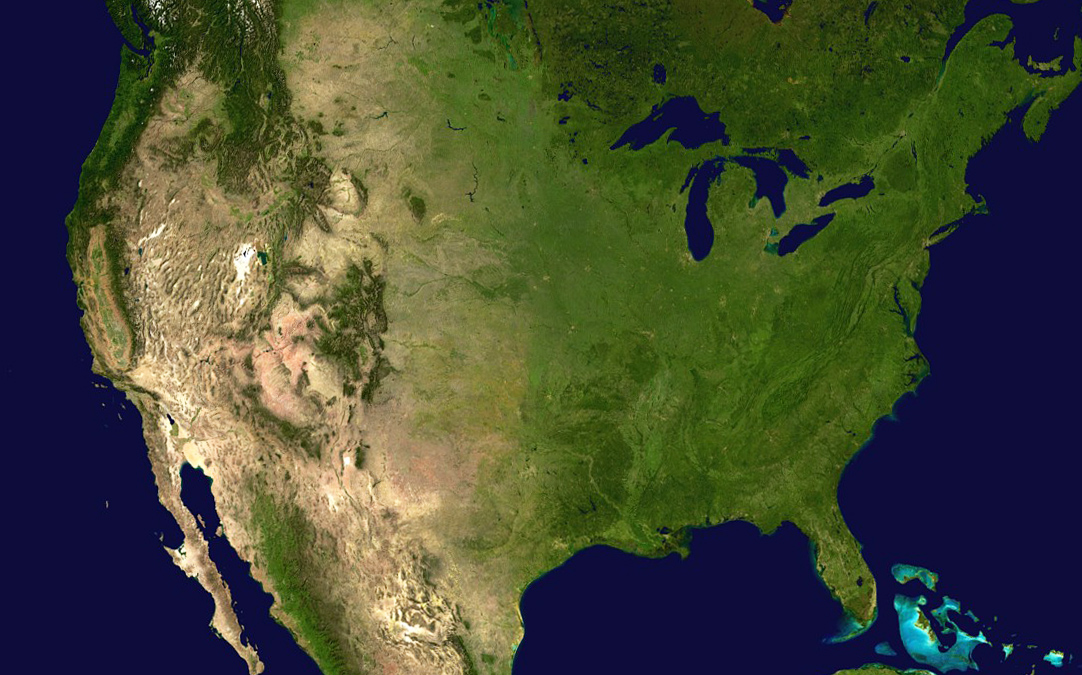
A satellite image of the contiguous United States, where temperate and subtropical forests of deciduous, coniferous, broadleaved evergreen, mixed vegetation, grasslands, montane forests, and croplands prevail are prevalent in the east, transitioning to prairies, boreal forests, the Rockies in the west, and deserts in the southwest. Much of the country's population is centered around the Great Lakes and Atlantic states.

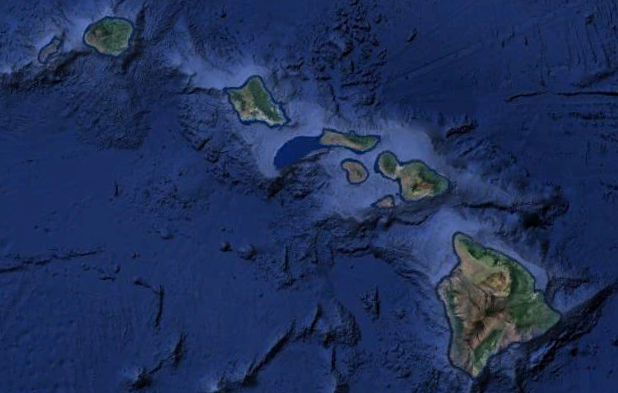
A satellite image of Hawaii, where volcanoes prevail on the Big Island; the islands have rugged coastlines, sandy beaches, and a tropical environment, though temperatures and humidity tend to be less extreme because of nearly constant trade winds from the east.

The United States shares land borders with Canada (8,891 km) to the north, and Mexico (3,145 km) to the south, a territorial water border with Russia in the northwest, and two territorial water borders in the southeast between Florida and Cuba, and Florida and the Bahamas. The contiguous 48 states are otherwise bounded by the Pacific Ocean on the west, the Atlantic Ocean on the east, and the Gulf of Mexico to the southeast. Alaska borders the Pacific Ocean to the south and southwest, the Bering Strait to the west, and the Arctic Ocean to the north; Hawaii lies far to the southwest of the mainland in the Pacific Ocean.

Forty-eight of the states are in the single region between Canada and Mexico. This group is referred to, with varying precision and formality, as the contiguous United States, and as the "Lower 48". Alaska, which is included in the term "continental United States", is located at the northwestern end of North America. The shoreline of the United States (50 states) is 94,122 miles (151,475 km) long, according to a NOAA measurement.

The nation's capital city, Washington, D.C., was established in 1800 after being relocated there from Philadelphia. It was established as a federal district located on land donated by the state of Maryland; Virginia also donated land, but it was returned in 1849. The United States also has overseas territories with varying levels of autonomy and organization, including the Caribbean territories of Puerto Rico and the U.S. Virgin Islands, formerly known as the Danish Virgin Islands and purchased by the United States at the beginning of World War II, the Pacific territories of American Samoa, Guam and the Northern Mariana Islands, and several uninhabited island territories. Some of the territories acquired were part of the territorial evolution of the United States or a product of the nation's effort to gain access to the east.

Nearly all of the United States is in the Northern Hemisphere with the exception of American Samoa and Jarvis Island.

== Physiographic divisions ==
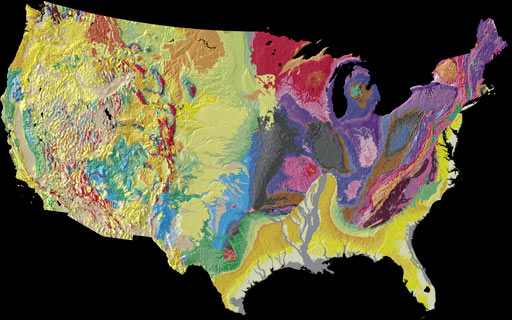
A physiographical map of the contiguous 48 states of the U.S. and indicating the age of the exposed surface and the type of terrain

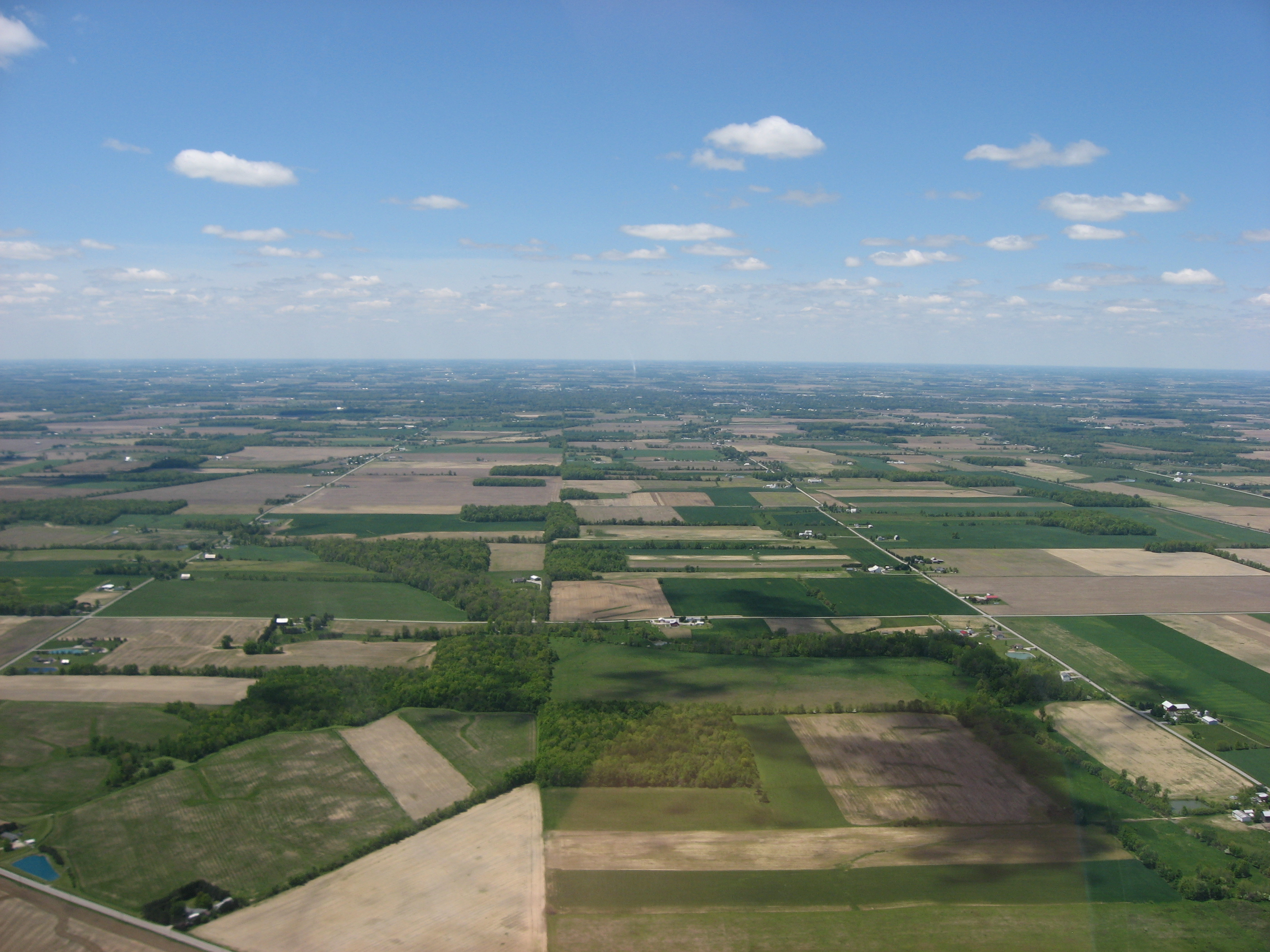
An aerial photo over northern Ohio; much of the central United States is covered by relatively flat, arable land.

Within the continental U.S. there are eight distinct physiographic divisions. These major divisions are:

- Laurentian Upland – part of the Canadian Shield that extends into the northern United States Great Lakes area.
- Atlantic Plain – the coastal regions of the eastern and southern parts include the continental shelf, the Atlantic Coast and the Gulf Coast.
- Appalachian Highlands – lying on the eastern side of the United States, it includes the Appalachian Mountains, the Watchung Mountains, the Adirondacks and New England province originally containing the Great Eastern Forest, a stretch of mixed temperature and subtropical montane forests, some of which are rainforests.
- Interior Plains – part of the interior continental United States, it includes the Great Plains, as well as a number of highland and mountainous regions, like the Black Hills, dense cave systems, painted hills and badland features.
- Interior Highlands – also part of the interior continental United States, this division includes the Ozark Plateau, the Ouachita Mountains, and other smaller mountain systems. This region is located largely in the warm temperate/subtropical moist and dry forest biomes.
- Rocky Mountain System – one branch of the American Cordillera system lying far inland in the western states.
- Intermontane Plateaus – also divided into the Columbia Plateau, the Colorado Plateau and the Basin and Range Province, it is a system of plateaus, basins, ranges and gorges between the Rocky and Pacific Mountain Systems. It is the setting for the Grand Canyon, the Great Basin and Death Valley.
- Pacific Mountain System – the coastal mountain ranges and features in the west coast of the United States.

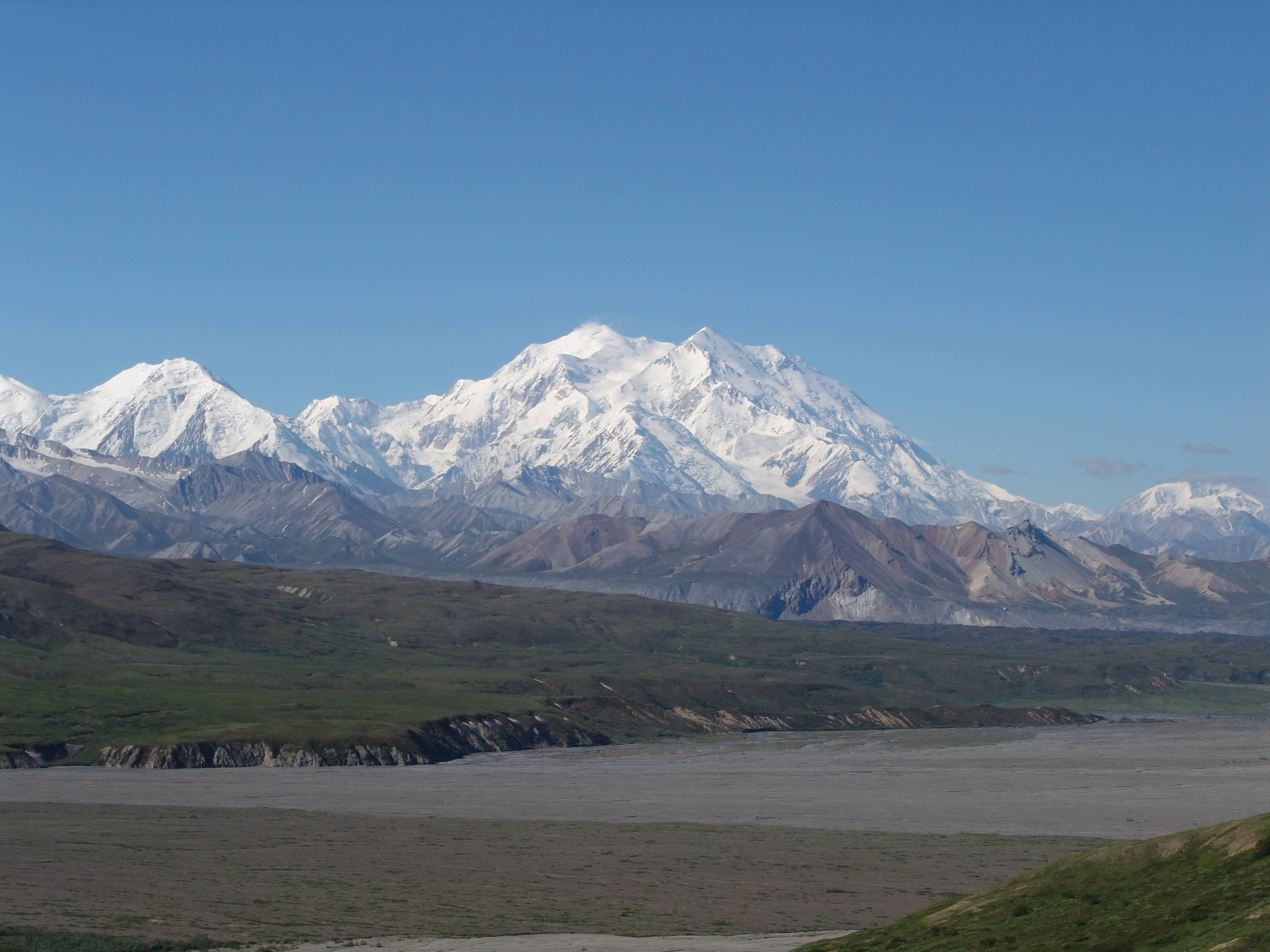
Denali, federally designated as Mount McKinley, in Alaska, is the tallest mountain in North America, at 20,310 ft (6,190.5 m).

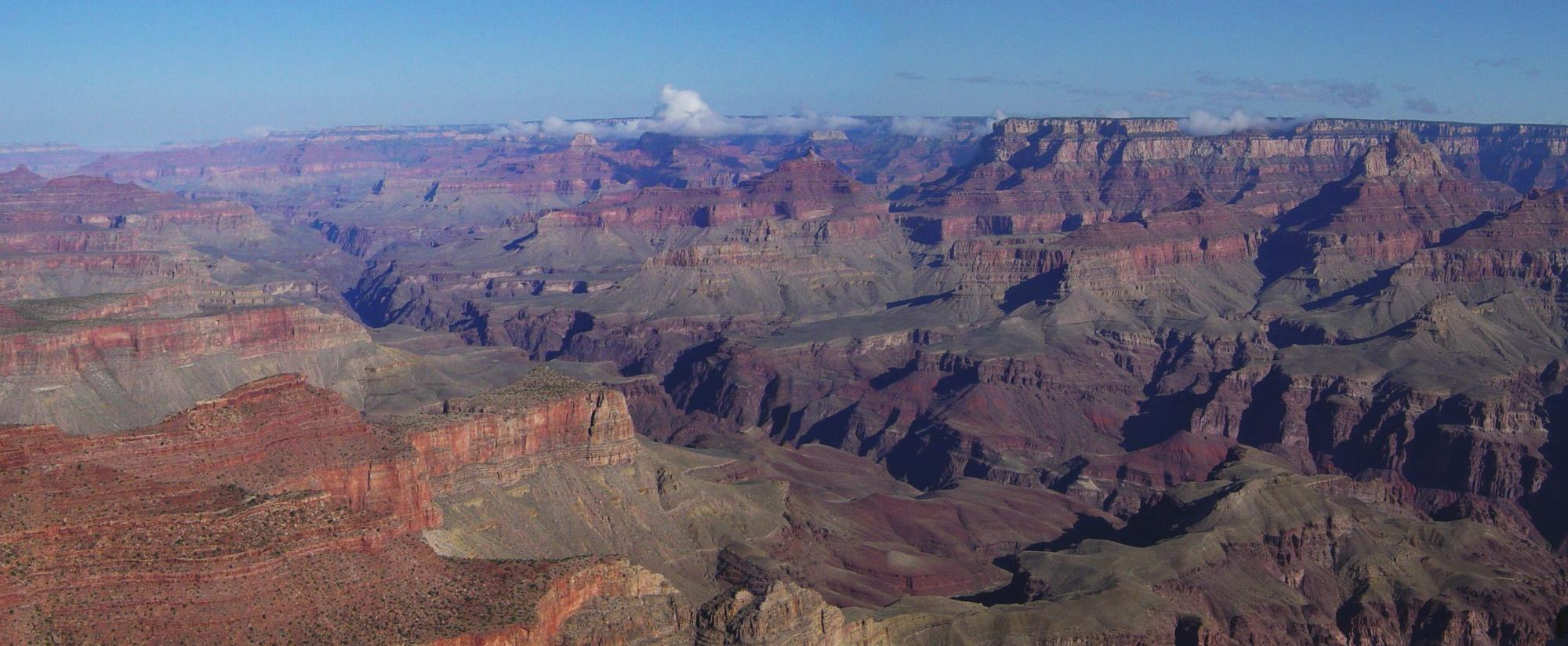
The Grand Canyon, seen here from Moran Point, is among the most visited locations in the country.

The eastern United States has a varied topography. A broad, flat coastal plain lines the Atlantic and Gulf shores from the Texas-Mexico border to New York City, and includes the Florida peninsula. This broad coastal plain and barrier islands make up the widest and longest beaches in the United States, much of it composed of soft, white sands. The Florida Keys are a string of coral islands that reach the southernmost city on the United States mainland at Key West in South Florida.

Areas further inland feature rolling hills, mountains, and a diverse collection of temperate and subtropical moist and wet forests. Parts of interior Florida and South Carolina are also home to sandhill communities. The Appalachian Mountains form a line of low mountains separating the eastern seaboard from the Great Lakes and the Mississippi basins. New England features rocky seacoasts and rugged mountains with peaks up to 6,200 feet and valleys dotted with rivers and streams. Offshore islands dot the Atlantic and Gulf coasts. A recent global remote sensing analysis suggested that there were 6,622 km^{2} of tidal flats in the United States, making it the 4th ranked country in terms of tidal flat area.

The five Great Lakes are located in the north-central portion of the country, four of them forming part of the border with Canada; only Lake Michigan is situated entirely within the United States. The southeast United States, generally stretching from the Ohio River southwards, includes a variety of warm temperate and subtropical moist and wet forests, as well as warm temperate and subtropical dry forests nearer the Great Plains in the west of the region. West of the Appalachians lies the lush Mississippi River basin and two large eastern tributaries, the Ohio River and the Tennessee River. The Ohio and Tennessee valleys and the Midwest consist largely of rolling hills, interior highlands and small mountains, jungle-like marsh and swampland near the Ohio River, and productive farmland, stretching south to the Gulf Coast. The Midwest also has a vast amount of cave systems.

The Great Plains lie west of the Mississippi River and east of the Rocky Mountains. A large portion of the country's agricultural products are grown in the Great Plains. Before their general conversion to farmland, the Great Plains were noted for their extensive grasslands, from tallgrass prairie in the eastern plains to shortgrass steppe in the western High Plains. Elevation rises gradually from less than a few hundred feet near the Mississippi River to more than a mile high in the High Plains. The generally low relief of the plains is broken in several places, most notably in the Ozark and Ouachita Mountains, which form the U.S. Interior Highlands, the only major mountainous region between the Rocky Mountains and the Appalachian Mountains.

The Great Plains come to an abrupt end at the Rocky Mountains. The Rocky Mountains form a large portion of the Western U.S., entering from Canada and stretching nearly to Mexico. The Rocky Mountain region is the highest region of the United States by average elevation. The Rocky Mountains generally contain fairly mild slopes and wider peaks compared to some of the other great mountain ranges, with a few exceptions, including the Teton Range in Wyoming and the Sawatch Range in Colorado. The highest peaks of the Rockies are found in Colorado, the tallest peak being Mount Elbert at 14,440 ft (4,400 m). Instead of being one generally continuous and solid mountain range, it is broken up into several smaller intermittent mountain ranges, forming a large series of basins and valleys.

West of the Rocky Mountains lies the Intermontane Plateaus, also known as the Intermountain West, a large, arid desert lying between the Rockies and the Cascades and Sierra Nevada ranges. The large southern portion, known as the Great Basin, consists of salt flats, drainage basins, and many small north–south mountain ranges. The Southwest is predominantly a low-lying desert region. A portion known as the Colorado Plateau, centered around the Four Corners region, is considered to have some of the most spectacular scenery in the world. It is accentuated in such national parks as Grand Canyon, Arches, Mesa Verde and Bryce Canyon, among others. Other smaller Intermontane areas include the Columbia Plateau, which covers eastern Washington state, western Idaho and northeast Oregon and the Snake River Plain in southern Idaho.

The Intermontane Plateaus come to an end at the Cascade Range and the Sierra Nevada. The Cascades consist of largely intermittent, volcanic mountains, many rising prominently from the surrounding landscape. The Sierra Nevada, further south, is a high, rugged, and dense mountain range. It contains the highest point in the contiguous 48 states, Mount Whitney (14,505 ft or 4,421 m). It is located at the boundary between California's Inyo and Tulare counties, just 84.6 mi or 136.2 km west-northwest of the lowest point in North America at the Badwater Basin in Death Valley National Park at 279 ft or 85 m below sea level. These areas contain some spectacular scenery as well, as evidenced by such national parks as Yosemite and Mount Rainier. West of the Cascades and Sierra Nevada is a series of valleys, such as the Central Valley in California and the Willamette Valley in Oregon. Along the coast is a series of low mountain ranges known as the Pacific Coast Ranges.

Alaska contains some of the most dramatic scenery in the country. Tall, prominent mountain ranges rise up sharply from broad, flat tundra plains. On the islands off the south and southwest coast are many volcanoes. Hawaii, far to the south of Alaska in the Pacific Ocean, is a chain of tropical, volcanic islands, popular as a tourist destination for many from East Asia and the mainland United States.

The territories of Puerto Rico and the U.S. Virgin Islands encompass a number of tropical isles in the northeastern Caribbean Sea. In the Pacific Ocean the territories of Guam and the Northern Mariana Islands occupy the limestone and volcanic isles of the Mariana archipelago, and American Samoa (the only populated US territory in the southern hemisphere) encompasses volcanic peaks and coral atolls in the eastern part of the Samoan Islands chain. (Note: One island in American Samoa (Swains Island) is not in the Samoan Islands — it is in the Tokelau island chain.)

The Atlantic coast of the United States is low, with minor exceptions. The Appalachian Highland owes its oblique northeast–southwest trend to crustal deformations which in very early geological time gave a beginning to what later came to be the Appalachian Mountain system. This system had its climax of deformation so long ago (probably in Permian time) that it has since then been very generally reduced to moderate or low relief. It owes its present-day altitude either to renewed elevations along the earlier lines or to the survival of the most resistant rocks as residual mountains. The oblique trend of this coast would be even more pronounced but for a comparatively modern crustal movement, causing a depression in the northeast resulting in an encroachment of the sea upon the land. Additionally, the southeastern section has undergone an elevation resulting in the advance of the land upon the sea.

While the Atlantic coast is relatively low, the Pacific coast is, with few exceptions, hilly or mountainous. This coast has been defined chiefly by geologically recent crustal deformations, and hence still preserves a greater relief than that of the Atlantic. The low Atlantic coast and the hilly or mountainous Pacific coast foreshadow the leading features in the distribution of mountains within the United States.

The east coast Appalachian system, originally forest covered, is relatively low and narrow and is bordered on the southeast and south by an important coastal plain. The Cordilleran system on the western side of the continent is lofty, broad and complicated, having two branches, the Rocky Mountain System and the Pacific Mountain System. In between these mountain systems lie the Intermontane Plateaus. Both the Columbia River and Colorado River rise far inland near the easternmost members of the Cordilleran system, and flow through plateaus and intermontane basins to the ocean. Heavy forests cover the northwest coast, but elsewhere trees are found only on the higher ranges below the Alpine region. The intermontane valleys, plateaus and basins range from treeless to desert with the most arid region being in the southwest.

Elevation extremes:

- Lowest point: Death Valley, Inyo County, California −282 ft (−86.0 m)
- Highest point: Denali/Mount McKinley, Denali Borough, Alaska 20,310 ft (6,190.5 m)

== Climate ==
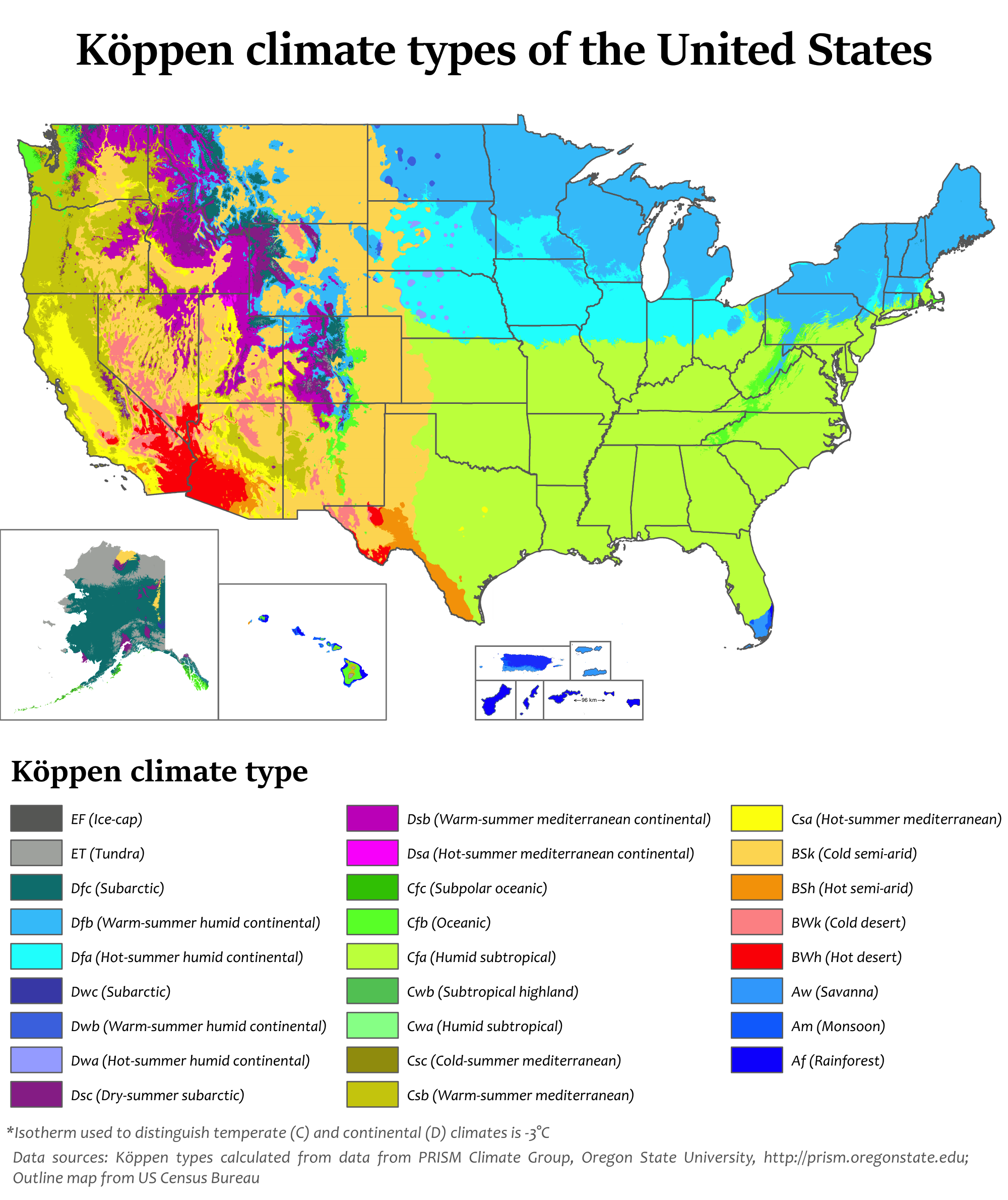
The Köppen climate types of the United States, including the five inhabited U.S. territories)

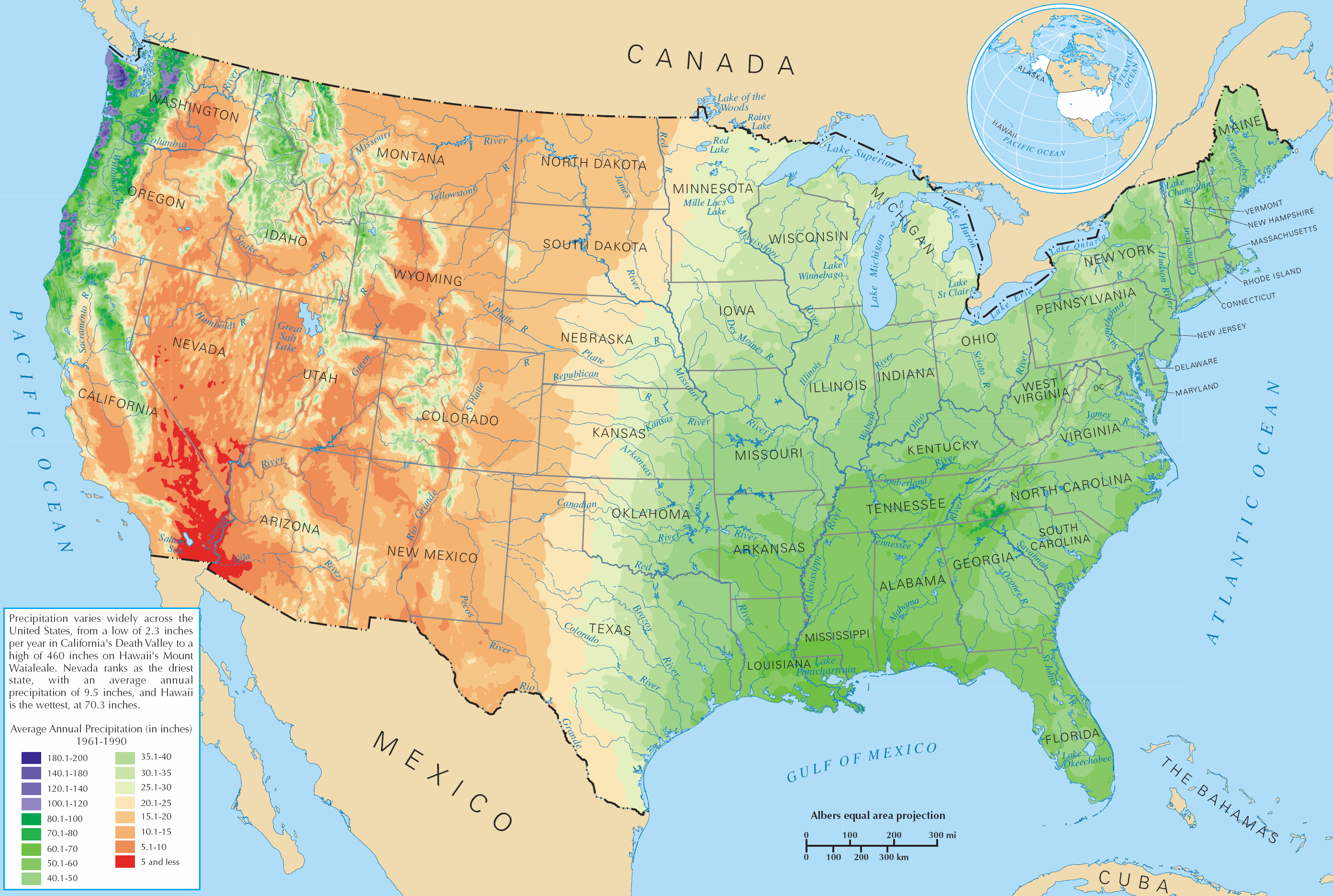
A map of average precipitation across the contiguous United States

Due to its large size and wide range of geographic features, the United States contains examples of nearly every global climate. The climate is subtropical in the Southern United States, continental in the north, tropical in Hawaii and southern Florida, polar in Alaska, semiarid in the Great Plains west of the 100th meridian, Mediterranean in coastal California and arid in the Great Basin and the Southwest. Its comparatively favorable agricultural climate contributed (in part) to the country's rise as a world power, with infrequent severe drought in the major agricultural regions, a general lack of widespread flooding, and a mainly temperate climate that receives adequate precipitation.

The main influence on U.S. weather is the polar jet stream which migrates northward into Canada in the summer months, and then southward into the US in the winter months. The jet stream brings in large low-pressure systems from the northern Pacific Ocean that enters the US mainland over the Pacific Northwest. The Cascade Range, Sierra Nevada, and Rocky Mountains pick up most of the moisture from these systems as they move eastward via the orographic effect, and they are greatly diminished by the time they reach the High Plains.

Once they move over the Great Plains, uninterrupted flat land allows them to reorganize and can lead to major clashes of air masses. In addition, moisture from the Gulf of Mexico is often drawn northward. When combined with a powerful jet stream, this can lead to violent thunderstorms, especially during spring and summer. Sometimes during winter, these storms can combine with another low-pressure system as they move up the East Coast and into the Atlantic Ocean, where they intensify rapidly. These storms are known as Nor'easters and often bring widespread, heavy rain, wind, and snowfall to New England. The uninterrupted grasslands of the Great Plains also lead to some of the most extreme climate swings in the world. Temperatures can rise or drop rapidly, winds can be extreme, and the flow of heat waves or Arctic air masses often advance uninterrupted through the plains.

The Great Basin and Columbia Plateau (the Intermontane Plateaus) are arid or semiarid regions that lie in the rain shadow of the Cascades and Sierra Nevada. Precipitation averages less than 15 inches (38 cm). The Southwest is a hot desert, with temperatures exceeding 100 °F (37.8 °C) for several weeks at a time in summer. The Southwest and the Great Basin are also affected by the monsoon from the Gulf of California from July to September, which brings localized but often severe thunderstorms to the region.

Much of California consists of a Mediterranean climate, with sometimes excessive rainfall from October–April and nearly no rain the rest of the year. In the Pacific Northwest rain falls year-round but is much heavier during winter and spring. The mountains of the west receive abundant precipitation and very heavy snowfall. The Cascades are one of the snowiest places in the world, with some places averaging over 600 inches (1,524 cm) of snow annually, but the lower elevations closer to the coast receive very little snow.

Florida has a subtropical climate in the northern part of the state and a tropical climate in the southern part of the state. Summers are wet and winters are dry in Florida. Annually, much of Florida and the deep southern states is frost-free. The mild winters of Florida allow a massive tropical fruit industry to thrive in the central part of the state, making the US second to only Brazil in citrus production worldwide.

Another significant (but localized) weather effect is lake-effect snow that falls south and east of the Great Lakes, especially in the hilly portions of the Upper Peninsula of Michigan and on the Tug Hill Plateau in New York. The lake effect dumped well over 5 feet (1.52 m) of snow in the area of Buffalo, New York throughout the 2006–2007 winter. The Wasatch Front and Wasatch Range in Utah can also receive significant lake effect accumulations from the Great Salt Lake.

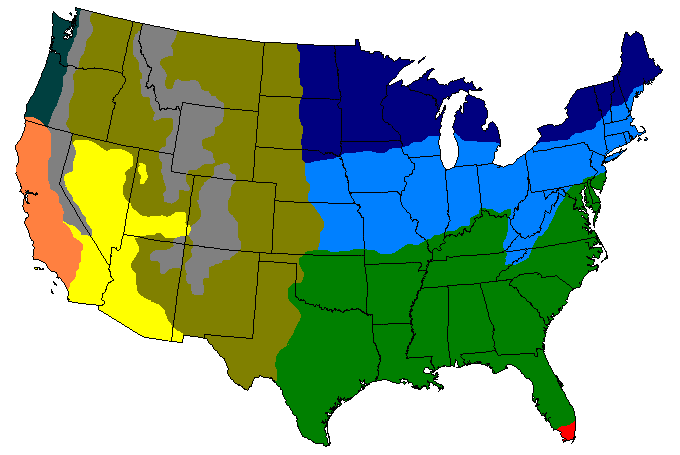
Climate map USA

Mitchell Map-06full2

=== Extremes ===
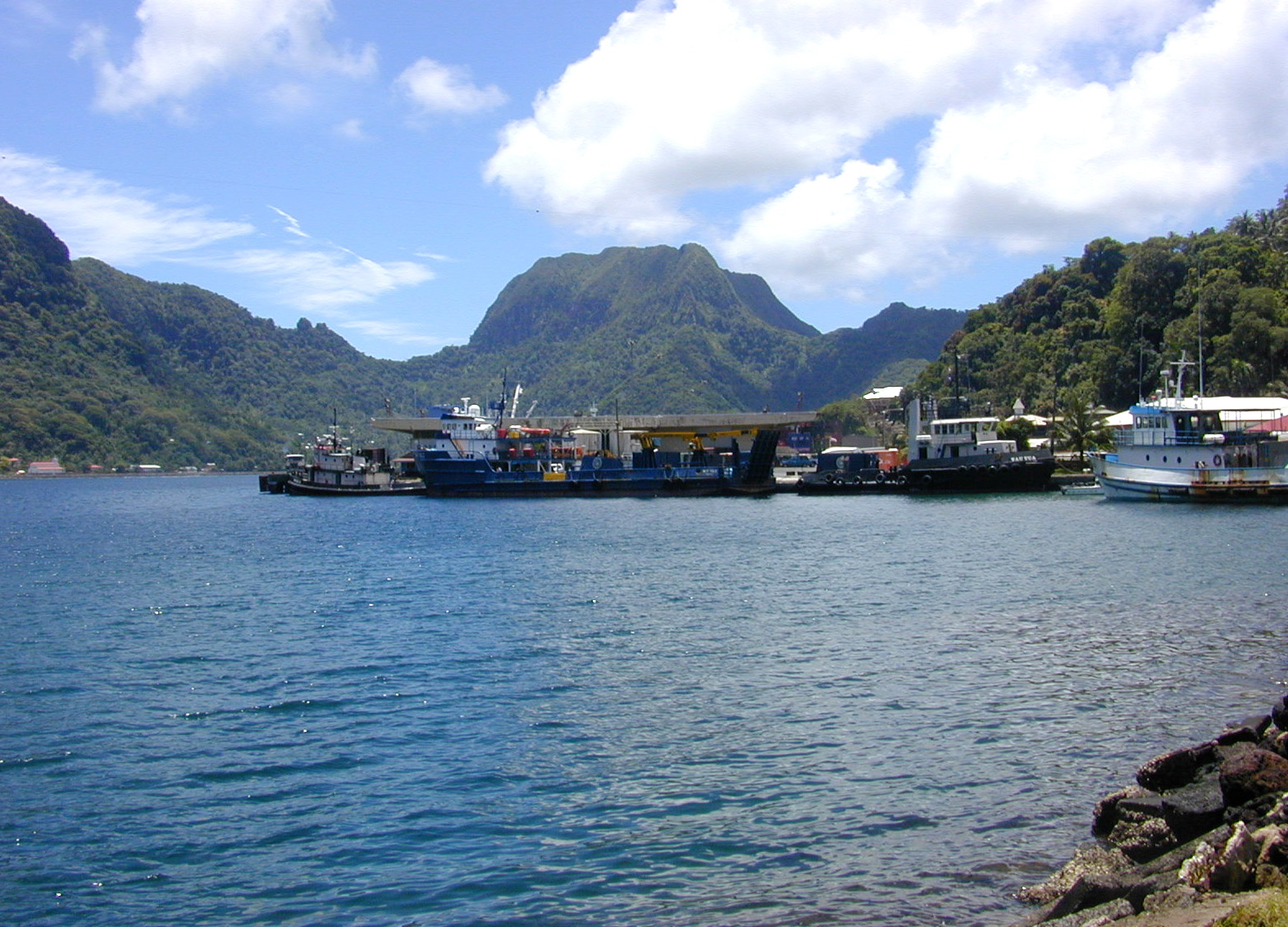
Pago Pago Harbor in American Samoa has the highest annual rainfall of any harbor in the world.

In northern Alaska, tundra and arctic conditions predominate, and the temperature has fallen as low as −80 °F (−62.2 °C). On the other end of the spectrum, Death Valley, California once reached 134 °F (56.7 °C), the highest temperature ever recorded on Earth.

On average, the mountains of the western states receive the highest levels of snowfall on Earth. The greatest annual snowfall level is at Mount Rainier in Washington, at 692 inches (1,758 cm); the record there was 1,122 inches (2,850 cm) in the winter of 1971–72. This record was broken by the Mt. Baker Ski Area in northwestern Washington which reported 1,140 inches (2,896 cm) of snowfall for the 1998–99 snowfall season. Other places with significant snowfall outside the Cascade Range are the Wasatch Mountains in Utah, the San Juan Mountains in Colorado, and the Sierra Nevada in California.

In the east, the region near the Great Lakes and the mountains of the Northeast receive the most snowfall, although they do not near snowfall levels in the western United States. Along the northwestern Pacific coast, rainfall is greater than anywhere else in the continental U.S., with Quinault Rainforest in Washington having an average of 137 inches (348 cm). Hawaii receives even more, with 404 inches (1,026 cm) measured annually in the Big Bog, in Maui. Pago Pago Harbor in American Samoa is the rainiest harbor in the world (because of the 523 meter Rainmaker Mountain). The Mojave Desert, in the southwest, is home to the driest locale in the U.S. Yuma, Arizona, has an average of 2.63 inches (6.7 cm) of precipitation each year.

In central portions of the U.S., tornadoes are more common than anywhere else on Earth and touch down most commonly in the spring and summer. Deadly and destructive hurricanes occur almost every year along the Atlantic seaboard and the Gulf of Mexico. The Appalachian region and the Midwest experience the worst floods, though virtually no area in the U.S. is immune to flooding. The Southwest has the worst droughts; one is thought to have lasted over 500 years and to have hurt Ancestral Pueblo peoples. The West is affected by large wildfires each year.

== Natural disasters ==
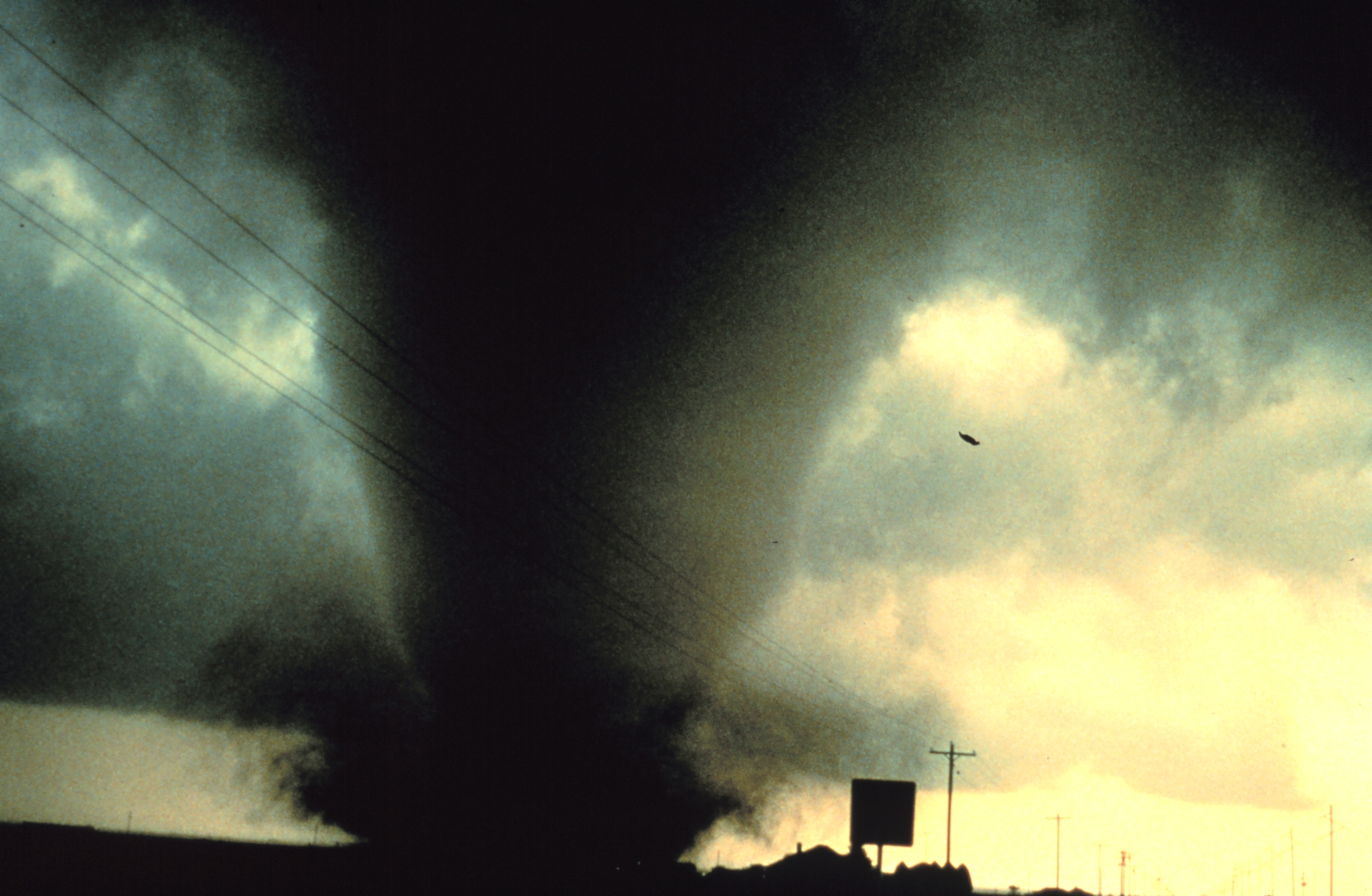
A powerful tornado near Dimmitt, Texas on June 2, 1995

The United States is affected by a variety of natural disasters yearly. Although drought is rare, it has occasionally caused major disruption, such as during the Dust Bowl (1931–1942). Farmland failed throughout the Plains, entire regions were substantially depopulated, and dust storms ravaged the land.

=== Tornadoes and hurricanes ===
Total devastation in Gulfport, Mississippi caused by storm surge from Hurricane Katrina in 2005

According to a 2023 Gallup survey, around one in three Americans said that they directly experienced a severe weather condition over the previous two years. The Great Plains and Midwest, due to the contrasting air masses, see frequent severe thunderstorms and tornado outbreaks during spring and summer with around 1,000 tornadoes occurring each year. The strip of land from north Texas north to Kansas and Nebraska and east into Tennessee is known as Tornado Alley, where many houses have tornado shelters and many towns have tornado sirens, due to the very frequent tornado formation in the region.

Hurricanes are another natural disaster found in the US, which can hit anywhere along the Gulf Coast or the Atlantic Coast as well as Hawaii in the Pacific Ocean. Particularly at risk are the central and southern Texas coasts, the area from southeastern Louisiana east to the Florida Panhandle, peninsular Florida, and the Outer Banks of North Carolina, although any portion of the coast could be struck. The U.S. territories and possessions in the Caribbean, including Puerto Rico and the U.S. Virgin Islands, are also vulnerable to hurricanes due to their location in the Caribbean Sea.

Hurricane season runs from June 1 to November 30, with a peak from mid-August through early October. Some of the more devastating hurricanes have included the Galveston Hurricane of 1900, Hurricane Andrew in 1992, Hurricane Katrina in 2005, and Hurricane Harvey and Hurricane Maria in 2017.

Hurricanes (known as cyclones in the Pacific Ocean) fail to make landfall on the Pacific Coast of the United States due to water temperatures being too cool to sustain them. However, the remnants of tropical cyclones from the Eastern Pacific occasionally impact the western United States, bringing moderate to heavy rainfall.

=== Flooding ===
Occasional severe flooding is experienced in the United States. Significant floods throughout history include the Great Mississippi Flood of 1927, the Great Flood of 1993, and widespread flooding and mudslides caused by the 1982–83 El Niño event in the western United States. Flooding is still prevalent, mostly on the Eastern Coast, during hurricanes or other inclement weather, for example in 2012, when Hurricane Sandy devastated the region. Localized flooding can, however, occur anywhere, and mudslides from heavy rain can cause problems in any mountainous area, particularly the Southwest. Large stretches of desert shrub in the west can fuel the spread of wildfires. The narrow canyons of many mountain areas in the west and severe thunderstorm activity during the summer lead to flash floods as well, which can sometimes be devastating, while nor'easter snowstorms can bring activity to a halt throughout the Northeast (although heavy snowstorms can occur almost anywhere).

=== Geologic ===
The West Coast of the continental United States makes up part of the Pacific Ring of Fire, an area of heavy tectonic and volcanic activity that is the source of 90% of the world's earthquakes. The Ring of Fire includes the Cascade Volcanoes in Washington, Oregon, and Northern California and the Aleutian Volcanic Arc in Alaska. Alaska has the highest number of active and dormant volcanoes at 101 volcanoes. The eight primary Hawaiian Islands are composed of 15 volcanoes, the youngest in a chain of 129 volcanoes that stretch approximately 3,800 miles (6,100 km) across the Pacific Ocean. The volcanic islands are youngest in the southeast. The island of Hawaiʻi is composed of four active volcanoes. There are several active volcanoes located in the islands of Hawaii, including Kilauea in ongoing eruption since 1983, but they do not typically adversely affect the inhabitants of the islands. There has not been a major life-threatening eruption on the Hawaiian Islands since the 17th century. Volcanic eruptions can occasionally be devastating, such as in the 1980 eruption of Mount St. Helens in Washington.

The Ring of Fire makes California and southern Alaska particularly vulnerable to earthquakes. Earthquakes can cause extensive damage, such as the 1906 San Francisco earthquake or the 1964 Good Friday earthquake near Anchorage, Alaska. California is well known for seismic activity and requires large structures to be earthquake resistant to minimize loss of life and property. Outside of devastating earthquakes, California experiences minor earthquakes on a regular basis.

There have been about 100 significant earthquakes annually from 2010 to 2012. Past averages were 21 a year. This is believed to be due to the deep disposal of wastewater from fracking. None have exceeded a magnitude of 5.6, and no one has been killed.

=== Other natural disasters ===
Other natural disasters include tsunamis around the Pacific Basin, mudslides in California, and forest fires in the western half of the contiguous U.S. Although drought is relatively rare, it has occasionally caused major economic and social disruption, such as during the Dust Bowl (1931–1942), which resulted in widespread crop failures and dust storms, beginning in the southern Great Plains and reaching to the Atlantic Ocean.

=== Consequences ===
According to report by U.S. Census Bureau, in 2022 natural disasters led to the forced displacement of 3.3 million people, more than 1.3% of the U.S. adult population, with half of the displacements being caused by the hurricanes. The survey-report stated that in Florida, the devastation caused by Hurricanes Ian and Nicole resulted in the relocation of around 1 million people, or about one in every 17 adult residents. In Louisiana, where inhabitants were still dealing with the devastating results of Hurricane Ida the year before, more than 409,000 people, or almost one in every eight residents, were moved. Despite this, the Louisiana state saw a relatively calm hurricane season in 2022.

== Public lands ==
Exclusive economic zones of the United States, including the nation's insular areas

The United States holds many areas for the use and enjoyment of the public. These include national parks, national monuments, national forests, wilderness areas, and other areas. For lists of areas, see the following articles:

- List of national parks of the United States
- List of national natural landmarks of the United States
- List of national forests of the United States
- List of wilderness areas of the United States

== Human ==
In terms of human geography, the United States is inhabited by a diverse set of ethnicities and cultures.

== See also ==
- County (United States)
- Geographic centers of the United States
- Geography of Puerto Rico
- Geography's impact on colonial America
- Index of United States-related articles
- List of extreme points of the United States
- List of fjords of the United States
- List of islands of the United States
- List of lakes of the United States
- Lists of landforms of the United States
- List of North American deserts
- List of rivers of the United States
- List of snowiest places in the United States by state
- Protected areas of the United States
- Public Land Survey System
- Territorial evolution of the United States

=== Regions ===
- Historic regions of the United States
- List of regions of the United States

=== Mountains ===
- List of mountain peaks of the United States
- List of mountains of the United States
