= List of fjords of the United States =

The fjords of the United States are mostly found along the glacial regions of the coasts of Alaska. These fjords — long narrow inlets in valleys carved by glacial activity — can have two or more basins separated by sills.

Most of the fjords in Washington originate off Puget Sound and the Salish Sea, while fjords in Alaska originate from numerous, more varied locations.

The Hudson River fjord in New York is recognized as the only true Fjord in the eastern coast of the United States

Somes Sound, a fjard located within Acadia National Park, is often mistaken for being another fjord located along the eastern coast of the United States.

== List of fjords ==
List of United States fjords:
Image	Fjord	State	Co-ordinates	Comments
	College Fjord	Alaska	61°08′00″N 147°52′00″W	The image provided is infrared enhanced.
	Hood Canal	Washington	47°48′N 122°42′W	
	Hudson River	New York	41°17′17″N 73°57′22″W	The Hudson River Fjord is recognized as the only true Fjord in the Eastern United States
	Icy Bay	Alaska	59°59′N 141°23′W	
	Lynn Canal	Alaska	58°37′01″N 135°04′30″W	Lynn Canal is the deepest fjord in North America (excluding Greenland).
	Misty Fjords	Alaska	55°37′18″N 130°36′26″W	
	Nassau Fjord	Alaska	60°15′46″N 148°21′25″W	
	Puget Sound	Washington	47°36′N 122°27′W	Puget Sound is a fjord system of many flooded glacial valleys and is the southernmost complex of fjords in North America.
	Russell Fjord	Alaska	59°51′00″N 139°30′00″W	
	Tracy Arm	Alaska	57°53′53″N 133°16′37″W	

== See also ==
- List of fjords in Canada
