= Cobián =

Cobián is a surname. Notable people with the surname include:

- Alfonso Valdés Cobián (1890–1988), industrialist, banker, sportsman and politician
- José Cobián (born 1998), Mexican professional footballer
- Juan Carlos Cobián (1888–1942), Argentine bandleader and tango composer
- Juan Cobián (born 1975), Argentine former footballer
- Miguelina Cobián (1941–2019), Cuban sprinter
- Ramón Valdés Cobián (fl. 1910s–1930s), Puerto Rican politician

== See also ==
- Cobia (disambiguation)
- Cobian Backup, backup software for Microsoft Windows
- Cobiana language, a language of Senegal and Guinea-Bissau
- Senator Cobián (disambiguation)
