= Surfing in Puerto Rico =

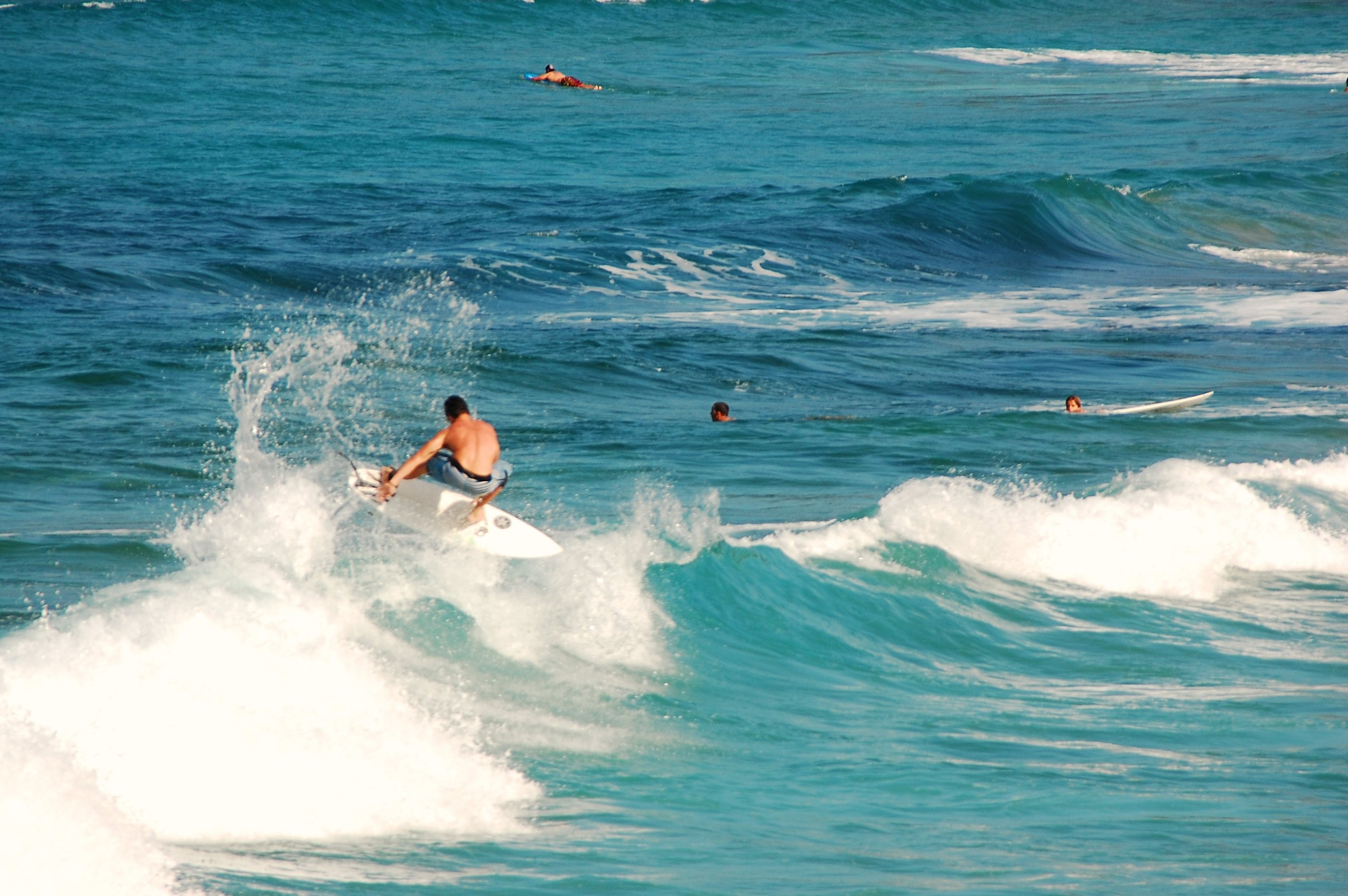
- Country: Puerto Rico
- Governing body: Federación Puertorriqueña de Surfing
- National team: Puerto Rico
- Nickname: Tabla Hawaiana

International competitions
- ISA World Surfing Games; Central American and Caribbean Games; Pan American and Caribbean Games

As a tropical Caribbean archipelago with several beaches featuring world-class waves on the main island's Northwest Coast and spots ranging from pointbreaks to beachbreaks, surfing has been a popular water sport in Puerto Rico since it was introduced during the 1950s, when it was first massified and professionalized outside the Pacific.The abundance of beaches facilitated the adoption of the sport and by the end of the decade, it was being practiced by young people in most of them. The local circuit was organized in 1965, remaining steady ever since, with the municipality of Rincón hosting the 1968 World Championships during this initial stage. During the 2010s, Brian Toth, Gaby Escudero and Ale Moreda were among the regulars in the local circuit. Arecibo hosted the 2024 World Surfing Games, which registered an attendance of 44,000. Puerto Rico fielded a team composed by Mia Calderón, Havanna Cabrero, Jólari Carreras, Brian Toth, Ricardo Delgado and Dwight Pastrana.

In October 2018, the legislature officially named Rincón "The Capital of the Sport of Surfing" and designated the second week of November as the "Week of Surfing" in Puerto Rico. In 2019, surfing was first incorporated as a sport in the 2019 Pan American Games with Maricarmen Rivera winning the bronze in SUP surfing. The 33rd edition of the Corona Extra Pro Surf Series included the most international competitors and introduced an equal pay system. At the 2023 Central American and Caribbean Games, the COPUR debuted the program at this regional event, with Anaís Mendoza and Havanna Cabrero won silver medals and José López bronze at the Surf City beach in San Salvador. In the 2023 Pan American Games, Mariecarmen Rivera won the bronze medal in SUP Racing. Luz Grande won the bodyboarding division at the 2025 PASA Games.

== History ==
=== Beginnings ===
First introduced by foreigners in 1960, surfing became popular among Puerto Rican during the decade, growing consistently after first gaining media attention as a fad practiced along skating, which was then called "sidewalk surfing". Initially the group that surfed in the beach near the Capitolio building was seen as a curiosity. The sport was also known as tabla hawaiiana (Spanish for "Hawaiian board") and was practiced by hundreds as early as 1962, but it remained disorganized during its first years. The legislature approved Law No. 19 of June 14, 1965 which forced surfers and practitioners of other aquatic sports to do so at a safe distance from any object or person. Sonny Medina organized the Club de Surfing de Santurce. By November 1965, the Asociación de Entrenadores de Natación organized the Campeonato Estatal de Surfing, a national championship in both the senior and U17 categories, held at Bajamar in Puerta de Tierra, San Juan. Félix Pérez was among the first to become known as a surfer, followed by Anino Irizzary, Manuel Betancourt, José Rodriguez and Guillermo Bermúdez. The event featured 75 surfers and an exhibition by George Kaeo, who had settled in Puerto Rico and was training the Buchanan team. Michael González, José Rodríguez and Bermúdez were the local performers to receive awards in the tournament, that also included experienced talent from abroad. The Compañía Cervecera de Puerto Rico's Cerveza India sponsored the November 1965 event. Hundreds of spectators attended the event, held near the Capitol building, out of curiosity. The FPS intended to match the conditions of Hawaii for the sport.The local beer industry was involved with sponsorship, with the awards being handed at Cervecería de Puerto Rico's Taberna India. In December 1965, the FPS and Cervecería India agreed to continue their sponsorship deal. Irizarry was the first Puerto Rican surfboard shaper, his first surfboard broke on the first wave but he kept improving his craft.

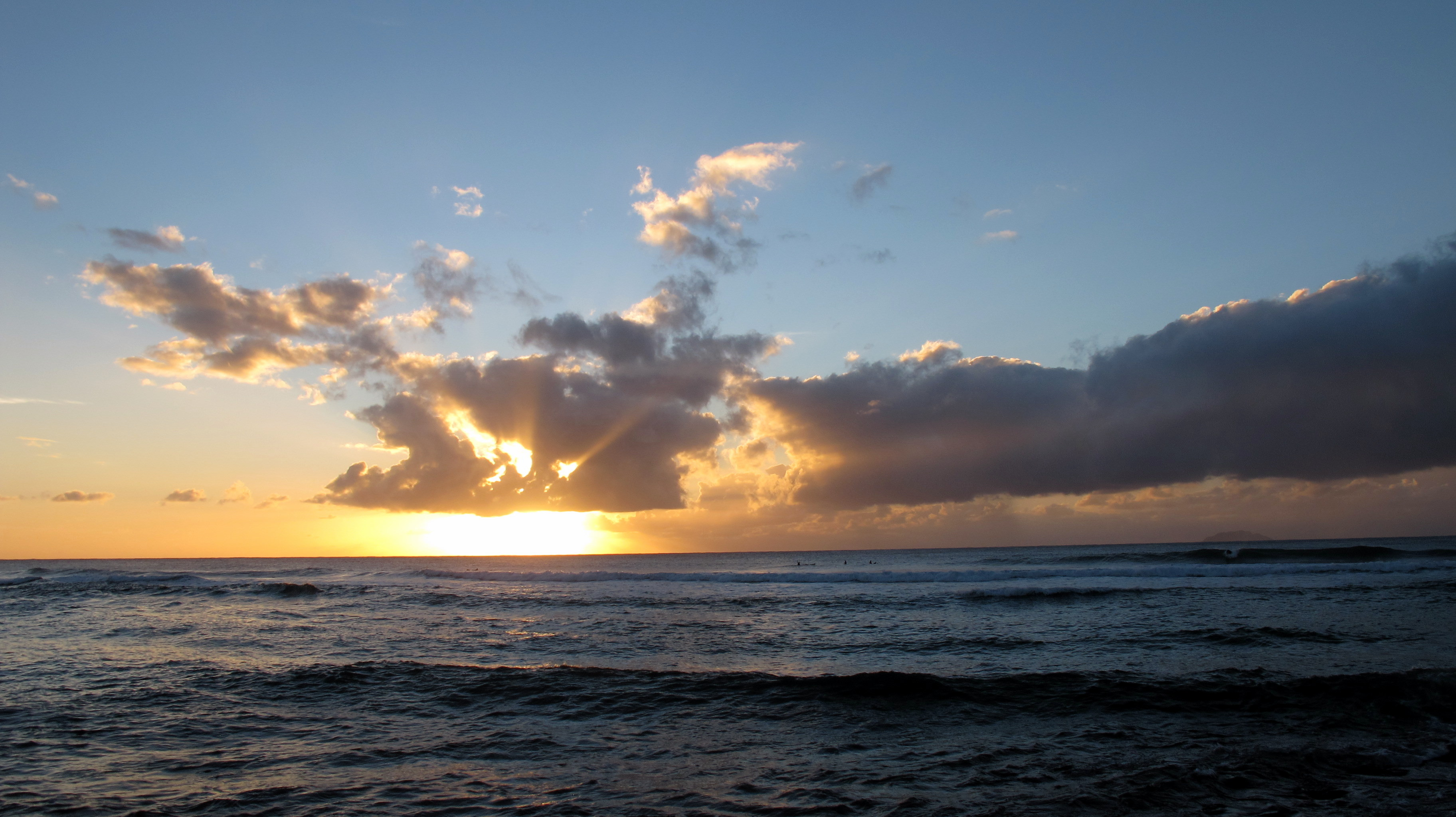
Maria's beach, a surfing spot at Rincón.

The Federación Puertorriqueña de Surfing was organized and led by José Rodríguez Reyes as a spinoff of the San Juan Surf Association founded a year earlier and by January 1966 held a tournament at Bajamar. Aniro Irizarry won the senior category and Jorge Machuca the junior division. The January 1966 event was sponsored by the Club de Leones de Isla Verde and Cerveza India. In January 1966, a bill was presented ted before the legislature to promote aquatic sports as a tourism venue. By January 1966, the FPS began considering the organization of a large scale event with the world and regional champions of the international circuit. The federation began pursuing the participation of Mickey Munoz, a top surfer from California, in addition to participants from Hawaii and Australia. In February 1966, the FPS held a reunion to discuss the logistics behind the first edition of the Torneo Anual de Pascua Florida event.

In February 1966, Club Waikiki invited Puerto Rico to an international tournament at Lima, Peru Among the first actions undertaken by the FPS was determining how they would choose the athletes that would travel there. The Federación de Escritores de Deportes gave an award to the federation for its work promoting the sport. By the next tournament, held at Bajamar in April 1966, the amount of participants had risen to over 200, with José Rodríguez Reyes winning the senior division. The trophies for the event were handed out at the Taberna India. Under the initiative of Sonny Medina, the Santurce-based Cerveza Corona Puerto Rico quickly began marketing its product towards the surfing crowd. Prior to the 1966 Winter Meetings, the FPS held a press conference. In November 1966, Jorge Machuca won another junior title in a federation tournament, receiving a new surfboard as an award. The following month, the second edition of the Torneo Invernal de Surfing was held at Bajamar beach. González and Machuca repeated among the winners. Cerveza India once again sponsored the December 1966 event.

When the Parque Luis Muñoz Rivera was being built, the planning states included the creation of a boardwalk with beach that was specifically intended to facilitate the practice of surfing. In March 1966, the federation organized the Noseriding Tournament at Pine Grove Beach in Isla Verde, Carolina, with the participation of 30 guest surfers from abroad, the San Juan Surf Association, Hobie Surf Team, Dewey Weber and Company and the Mayagüez Surf Club. The 1967 Torneo de Pascua was the first event to feature a women's division. Having expanded its membership to more than 400 members and eight clubs, the FPS organized its first qualifying events to select the team that would represent Puerto Rico at the World Championships at Rincón. The event featured the participation of 80 surfers in both men's and women's competition, several of which were affiliated with the teams of Isla Verde Surf Club and Mayagüez Surf Club. Rincón also hosted the Eastern Surfing Championship which featured 50 of the top ranked surfers in the United States and local participants such as José Rodríguez, with the International Contest pitting the East and West Coast champions against the Puerto Rican titlists.

=== The 1968 World Surfing Championships at Rincón ===
In January 1968, the annual event was held at Parada 8 beach at Puerta de Tierra, with the Jorge Machuca-led Hobie Surf Team seeking to revalidate after winning all five of its previous appearances. With six categories, this was the first tournament where the mini-surfboard was used competitively in Puerto Rico and also featured the debut of the Oku Surf Team. In November 1968, the municipality of Rincón hosted the fourth World Surfing Championships at Punta Higüero. The sport also gained popularity at Aguadilla and Atlantic Surfing magazine featured Bridges beach in an article. During the summer of 1968, a team composed by Machuca, Tito Aosti, Mike Burger, and Papo Martínez competed in an event held at Guibia beach in Santo Domingo, Dominican Republic. Cervecería Corona sponsored the World Championship leading up to the event. In September 1968, the FPS held eliminators in four divisions to select the team that would represent Puerto Rico at the event. More were held for youth categories the following month.

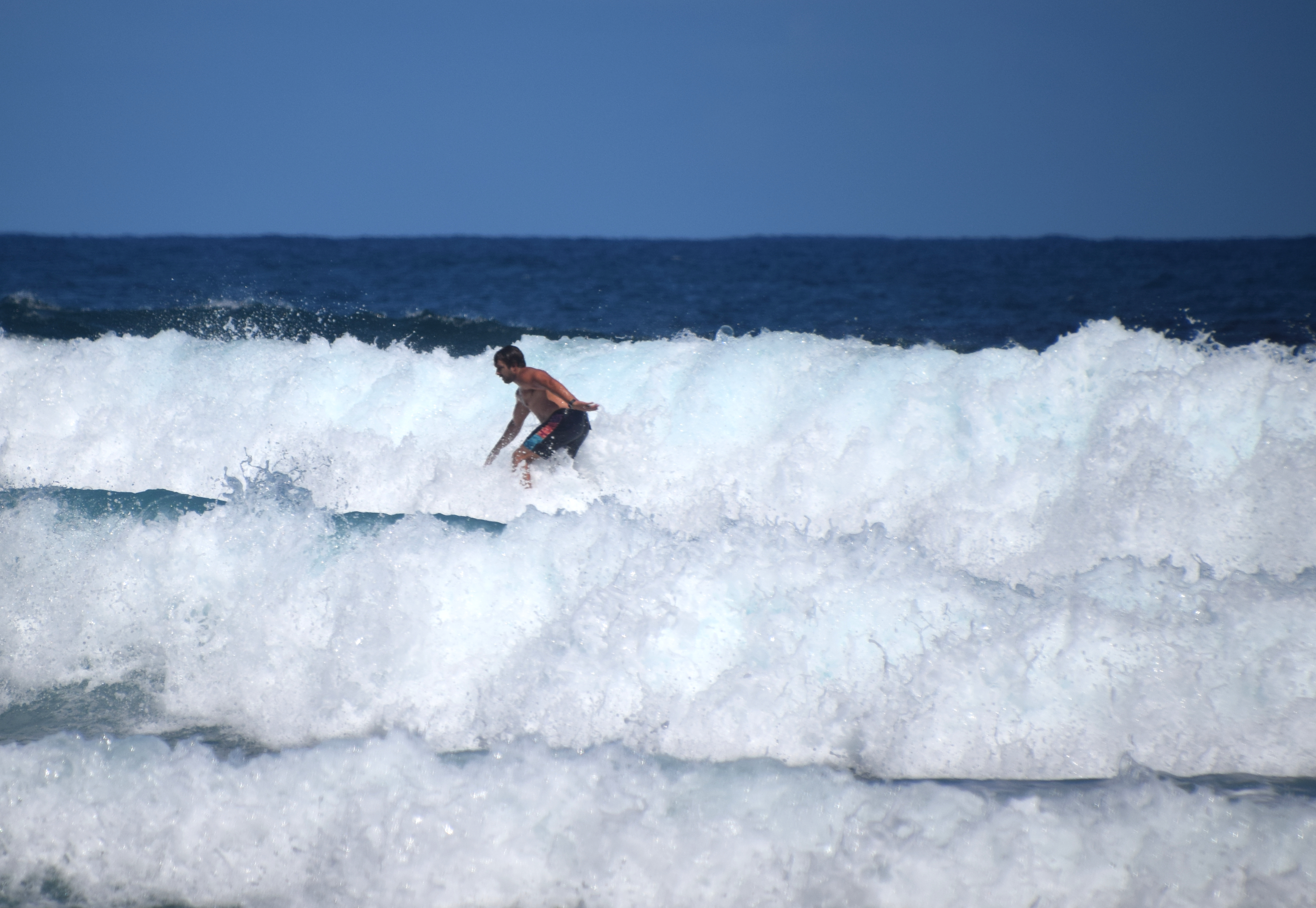
Surfer's Beach at Aguadilla.

The Sub-Director of Fomento Económico stated that the agency's goal was to create a "vocational center" for the sport that covered the west coast of Puerto Rico. In October 1968, the FPS announced that 15 nations had already confirmed.The sport and the favorable conditions to practice it in Puerto Rico was also featured in an edition of the now-defunct Bohemia magazine. The organization of the World Championships involved about 1,500 persons, which operated out of the Mayagüez Hilton. Delegations from 16 countries, including Australia with incumbent champion Nat Young, entered the tournament. Among the oter participants were former world champions Felipe Pomar and Midget Farrelly. A total of 17 countries participated. Eduardo Arena, president of the International Surfing Federation, arrived in Puerto Rico during the last week of October. The administration of the Mayagüez Hilton was proactive in promoting the sport and provided operational headquarters for the event. Cervecería Corona became an early sponsor for the tournament and donated the trophies. On its part, Destilería Serrallés had the event televised.

The Puerto Rican team comprised Jorge Machuca, Tommy Hardy, Rickey Bloomquist and Rogelio Varas on the men's side with Candy Chase and Susan King on the women's side. The first day of competition had to be delayed due to the wave conditions. For Puerto Rico, Fernando Valdés and Tommy Harding advanced to the round of 28. Calm seas caused further delays. On the women's side, Candy Chase finished fifth for Puerto Rico. The heats were televised abroad via the American Broadcasting Company's (ABC) Wide World of Sports. The event granted Rincón, Puerto Rico international sports media exposure. The municipality continued attracting surfers and hippies afterwards. In January 1969, Richard Knorr won a tournament at Guipia beach in the Dominican Republic representing Puerto Rico. Locally, the federation chose representatives per area and scheduled the annual tournaments. Brandy Álvarez (senior), Jorge Machuca (15-17 years), Darel Cabrera (7-13 years), Stephanie Cabrera (women's) and Benjie Meléndez (senior men) were the champions at the Winter Championships. Machuca and Stephanie Cabrera repeated in a tournament held at Puerto de Tierra in March 1969. The Campeonato de Surfing de Pascua Florida were held the following month at Puerta de Tierra, with Richard Sollo (senior), Machuca (junior and open), Greg Saunders (U13) and Susan King (women's) were the champions. The FPS was among the governing bodies that joined government to form a water sports confederation.

=== Stagnation and reemergence ===
In September 1969, the Mayagüez Surf Club hosted its own competition. The national tournament was scheduled for the fall. After Puerto Rico was invited to the World Championships, qualifiers were held in March 1970. Machuca led the event to classify, followed by Ricky Blomquist in a group of ten finalists. Machuca, Blomquist and Darrell Gómez were the surfers that qualified in the finals. Susan King was elected as the female member of the team, while Tom Hardy joined once they were at Sydney. That month the FPS also elected a new directive, led by Adriano Porrata as president. The first summer event under this regime was the summer tournament, held on May 30, 1970. The federation also sponsored the screening of a documentary filmed during the Rincón and Sydney World Championships at Miramar. Following the team's participation at Australia, there was an interlude of competition that extended until the last week of August 1970. Kenny Lequilla (A1), Mussin Álvarez (A2) and Porrata himself (A3) won the various classes of the event held at Playa Los Aviones at Boca de Cangrejos near the town of Loíza. Another was organized during the fall at Pine Grove beach, with three categories of competition and Blomquist (AAA), Peter Rodríguez (AA) and Poncho Ortega (A) emerging as winners. After its vice president migrated abroad, the federation held partial elections at the Puerto Rico Island Surf Shop at Isla Verde, Carolina, with James M. Smith filling the vacancy and Falín Mayoral became treasurer. The store became a frequent hud of surfing activity, also being used for press announcements and trophy ceremonies. Condado Surf Shop (at Santurce), Ocean Park Surf Shop and UK Surf Shop (Rincón) also joined as tournament inscription centers. Island Surf Shop also began designing and manufacturing its own surfboards, specifically designed for the local waves and conditions.

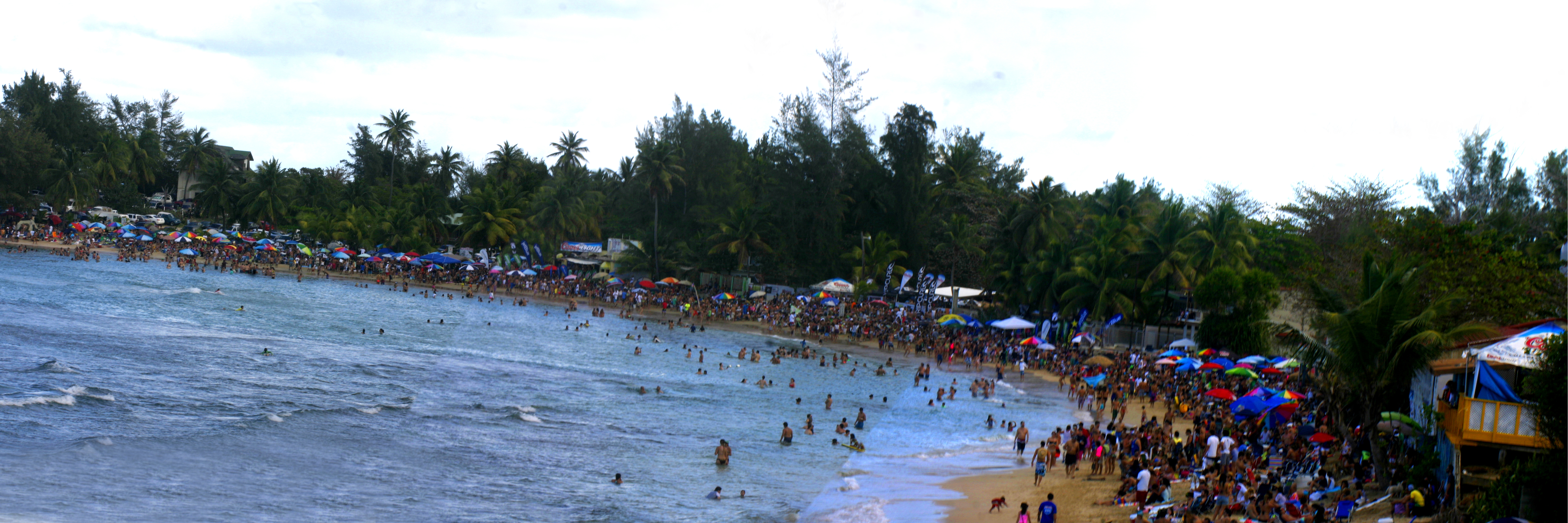
Surfing event at Jobos beach.

As more tourists came during the summer fleeing the colder weather, Rincón received about a hundred of them and the island quickly gained the reputation as the "Hawaii of the Atlantic". In January 1971, the federation held a tournament in the town where the governor was the invited guest. Jorge Machuca (AAA), Musín Suárez (AA) and José Sira (A) won the three divisions. The next event was the VI Competencia Anual de Surfing Pascuas Floridas tournament was held in April 1971. The Competencia de la Primavera was held at Parada 8 and Los Aviones in June, Jorge Machuca (AAA), Darío Meyer (AA) and Gadi Koppel (A) were the winners. In July 1971, the Festival de Surfing was held at Playa Jobos in Aguadilla with Machuca (AAA), Meyer (AA) and Tony Crespí (A) emerging victorious. The federation closed the season by organizing a tournament at Rincón, with Machuca (AAA), Kenny La Guay (AA) and Joaquín Mayoral (A) earning wins. By this time, the residents of the municipality had adopted the surfboard as one of its representative symbols. Vega Baja, a northern town, incorporated surfing to the Festival de Música. The event initially began as a separate event, with the FSP becoming involved by holding its tournament, with most of the backlash being due to it being a hippie cultural fest. By the year's end, Machuca was regarded as the most accomplished surfer during the year. However, his career was cut short when he suffered an accident that left him wheelchair bound, but was still regarded as a legend 50 years later.

Surfing was favored by young people throughout the 1960s, with several of the local beaches such as Jobos and Punta Higüera becoming popular spots, but the initial craze waned by the mid-1970s. The team that represented Puerto Rico at the 1972 World Surfing Championships was composed by Tony Yordán, Johnny González, José Álvarez and Georgie Fernández. By the end of 1973, Smith had been elected federative president and money prizes were being offered for the first place in competitions. During the winter, Willy Huleyo won the national championship, which was sponsored by Water World (San Juan) and Island Surfboard (Rincón). By 1974, local surfboards were being designed and made by Néstor Ramírez Lugo, who created the Pelícano Surfboards brand at Jobos. The Winter Caribbean Titles were held at Parada 8 in January 1975 with Antonio Castro (A) and Don Damm (AAA) winning the championships. having grown to secure the sponsorship of one of Puerto Rico's largest distilleries, Destilería Serrallés, and its main rum brand Don Q. By this time the touristic potential of Puerto Rico's surging hotspots was being emphasized by the governor as potential venue of revenue. By this time a sharp decline in the popularity of surfing was noted, affecting the competitive circuit, but the recreational amateur practice continued unabated in places like Condado and Isla Verde. The tourism department of the municipal government of Rincón was organized in 1977, exploring from its inception how to extrapolate the reputation as the "Capital of Surfing in the Caribbean" into visitors. Other initiatives, like the Sandy Hills condominium at Luquillo, also exploited the sport to attract customers. By the winter Rincón, along other towns in the coast from Mayagüez to Aguadilla managed to exploit the surfing tourism, attracting hundreds of athletes to their beaches.

Puerto Rico attended the 1978 World Surfing Championships at South Africa. Associated sports like windsurfing, also gained a presence during this time a places like Palmas del Mar in Humacao. In October 1978, eliminators were held to select the national team that would compete in the World Championships to be held at Hawaii. Edwin Santos participated at the 1979 Hang Ten Trial at South Africa, winning the event. In November 1979, the Puerto Rico Tourism Company collaborated with the federation on the first edition of the Torneo Nacional de Surfing, held at Punta Borinquen in Aguadilla and which also served a qualifier for the World Championships. Throughout this decade, the Villa Marina Yacht Harbour held exhibitions of water sports, including surfing. That year, Edwin Santos represented Puerto Rico at the World Surfing Championships in Hawaii, defeating Dane Kealoha in the opening heat and advancing, ultimately finishing in the fifth place. He continued his international career with appearances at Japan, Australia, California, Brazil and Indonesia, among others and received sponsorships from brands like Hang Ten, Gerry Lopez's Lightning Bolt Surfboards and Brenda Scott-Rogers' Hotline Surfboards. In April 1980, residents of Rincón were joined civic and religious organizations and called on the Municipal Assembly to withhold the permission for a pro-am tournament and cultural gathering scheduled to take place at Punta Higüera, claiming that it would have detrimental effects on the health and environment, but the Department of Natural Resources did not respond promptly. Eventually the event, called Festival de Surfing Boricua or Island's Rincón '80, was paralyzed despite having the support of the town's mayor. The tournament ultimately proceeded and extended for three days, also incorporating beach volleyball, paddleball and bodyboarding. Álvarez competed at the 1980 World Surfing Championships at Biarritz.

=== Second World Surfing Championships ===
In the press conference where Carlos Romero Barceló announced his administration's plan to build a fossil fuel power station at Rincón, a young surfer urged the governor to reconsider the location due to the sports and tourism infrastructure already in place. The following month, the FPS formally began a campaign to oppose the construction at the site citing that it would damage the sand, touristic and sports value due to the construction of a seawall. The director of the Autoridad de Energía Eléctrica (AEE), Bruno Vega, acknowledged the importance of the geomorphology for the waves in the sport, but insisted that the environmental studies took this under consideration. Thousands of young citizens organized to oppose the environmental effects that the plant would represent. The University of Puerto Rico at Aguadilla's Club de Deportes de Playa held its first Competencia Interuniversitaria de Surfing. The Campeonato Anual de Surfing Rincón '81 and its associated festival were held at Playa Puntas de Rincón and sponsored by Pollo Fresco To-Ricos, one of the main brands of the poultry industry in Puerto Rico, Alfa Rock and other local and foreign brands, featuring a musical lineup that included salsa and rock. Edwin Santos wom the event, with attendance in the thousands. When tropical storm Gert approached Puerto Rico, many surfers used the surge to surf.

Various places, like Ocean Park and Condado continued being frequented by amateur surfers. The second edition of the Competencia Interuniversitaria de Surfing was held by UPRA Club de Deportes. During the winter months, tourists continued vacationing in Puerto Rico to surf. The organization of Rincón '82 at Punta Borinquen was promoted as the first professional tournament organized locally, with surfers from Europe, Central, South and North America being invited to compete. The competition featured International Professional Surfers (IPS) and offered prices up to $15,000, over 50,000 were expected to attend including the eliminators held at Domes beach. World champion Mark Foo and contenders Jeff Klugel, John Futch and Leyris Grave were among the visitors. Besides the municipal government, the event had the collaboration of the AEE, the Puerto Rico Police Bureau and members of the legislature for the region. During this time, Edwin Santos was considered a promising prospect and was recruited by the Puerto Rico Department of Sports and Recreation to offer classes, which he also did by himself at the Atlantic Surf Shop. He repeated his title at that year's international contest, held at San Juan. Santos also became involved in other aspects of the sport, creating his own brand of surfboards named Local Energy. The team of Álvarez and Fernández competed at the 1982 World Surfing Championships held at South Africa. During the summer, local retailer store La Esquina Famosa held a contest sponsored by Hang Ten that gifted several surfboards to the winners. According to retailer Luis A. Morales, the brand was noted to have been favored among sportswear. The sport faced some pushback from pedestrians that questioned its practice along beach goers at places like El Condado, feeling that they represented a potential source of danger. Facilities for surfing were built at Tortuguero in the municipality of Vega Baja. Roberto Santos won a local tournament held at Arecibo.

Hallows beach at Arecibo.

During the fall, Edwin Santos won the Sun Breaker Contest at Japan, winning the event's $4,000 prize. In November the first Torneo de Surfing Universitario was held at the University of Puerto Rico at Mayagüez (RUM), but the sport was still not featured as part of the Liga Atlética Interuniversitaria (LAI). In February 1983, the Club de Deportes held its annual Competencia Interuniversitaria de Surfing at Surfer's Beach in Aguadilla. The sport remained of interest to the public and became interwoven into popular culture by commerce, being included in an aquatic sports exhibition and with the Villa Antonio Beach Resort at Rincón using it as its main attraction. The Caribe Hilton incorporated its symbology and elements into an artistic event. At Yabucoa, the yearly Surf-Contest was sponsored by Amigos del Arte. At team led by Santos represented Puerto Rico in the 1984 Triple Crown of Surfing held at Hawaii, finishing in the fifth position. During this time, Surfing Magazine also published an edition dedicated to the local scene. The Partido de Renovación Puertorriqueña proposed converting Rincón into a "world surfing center" as part of its government platform, which intended to break the Puerto Rico Tourism Company into regional organizations. During the spring, the FPS held its eliminators to define a team that was going to participate at the World Surfing Championship at Los Angeles. The Eastern Surfing Association (ESA) sponsored the Sun Country Tour that was held at Jobos beach and offered $10,000 in prizes, with an attendance of over 5,000. The event was overseen by the Federación de Surfing de Puerto Rico (FSPR), organized and then led by José Álvarez, which also lobbied in favor of free access to the beaches. During the summer, the governing body also trained new competition officials. When Arecibo celebrated the Festival Playero Víctor Rojas, surfing was among several beach sports included in the event.

Roberto Santos, Javier Gorbea, Wilfredo González, Alex Beale, Alberto Licha, Filiberty Bonilla, Matt Watson, Héctor Aparicio, Becky Taylor, Carlos Banuchi and Rex Roettger vlassified for the LA World Surfing Championships, with Mike Shand also performing as competition judge. El Escambrón continued being a spot for the recreational practice of the sport. In March 1985, the Caribbean Cup was held at Jobos beach with the participation of surfers from Brazil, Venezuela, Barbados, the Dominican Republic, France and the United States. Javier Gorbea won the adult category and the "Best Surfer of the Caribbean" award, Alberto Licha finished first in the open category, while a young led Kelly Slater the junior division. Héctor Aparicio and Alex Beale also finished among the top performers. Competing at the 20th Annual International Championship at Peru, Licha finished in the third place. Afterwards, he was featured in the WSTE-DT television program Dimensión Juvenil. The Cangrejos Yacht Club made surfing a feature in their nautical exhibition. In a federative event held at Hollows beach 13-year old Rafi Llompart defeated veterans Filiberto Bonilla, Angel Ayala and Melvin Rivera in the open category, also winning the junior division over Jorge Nido. At the first Surfing Championship at Aviones, Alex Beagle won the adult competition while José López led among the junior men. Along the white sand beach at Punta Borinquen other spots like, Crash Boat Beach and Kikita beach, were well regarded for surfing during the 1980s.

The sport also gained mainstream exposure due to being among Chayanne's favorites. The municipal government of San Juan and the Federación de Surfing de San Juan began a program to promote the sport among the youth of La Perla. The Mayagüez Hilton advertised surfing as one of its main attractions. The team of Mat Waton, Alberto Licha, Alex Beale, Angel Ayala, Robert Ferrer, Héctor Aparicio, Angel Alvarez, Juan Ashton, Rafi Llompart, Becky Taylor and Barbara Roettger represented Puerto Rico at the 1986 World Surfing Championships. In February 1987, the third Caribe Sun Country Cup was held at Jobos beach, then serving as the second largest local tournament and featuring locals and invited surfers from Barbados, Venezuela, Costa Rica, the United States, Panama, Bahamas and the United States Virgin Islands. The following month, the second Campeonato Anual de Surfing La Selva at La pared beach in Luquillo ended with Juan Ashton as the Men's champion, Rafi Llompart as the Boys champion, Onix Vázquez as the Junior champions, Alex Beagle as the Master's champion and Jack Griek as the Longboard champion. In April, the Easter '87 tournament was organized at Aviones beach, which Manuel Cabrero won in the Open category, Juan Ashton in the Juniors, Rafael Cabrero in the Boys and Alex Beagle in the Master's, with a bodyboarding division being held and won by Héctor Díaz. In February 1988, the Budweiser World Surfing Title was held at Aguadilla with 26 guest nations and 400 surfers. Puerto Rico fielded a team trained by Juan Ibáñez composed by Max Trinidad, Anibal Santiago, Juan Ibánez, Franco lạrruci, Rafi Llompart, Dave Williams, Manuel de Gracia, Eric Fridman, Matt Watsdon, Ricky Lusson, Francisco Bielsa, Juan Ashton, Hal Burger, Ángel Ayala, Evaristo Merced, Mike Shand, Becky Tarlor, Jenny Moore and Alberto Licha. Seven out of the ten Puerto Rican participants advanced to the semifinals, which were held at Jobos beach. The local team continued in competition, gathering 349 points to remain in the top-ten. Both Ashton and Merced finished second in the semifinals of the Open and Bodyboarding categories. The team finished sixth, lamenting that the waves did not favor th throughout the competition.

On his part, José Álvarez ran as a candidate for president of the ISA, being elected with the unanimous vote (25-0) of all participating nations and becoming the first non-British to hold the office. While the event was taking place, the media lobbed criticism at the COPUR for failing to sanction surfing at the moment, while sanctioning snow-related winter sports like snowboarding. The DRD supported its inclusion in the governing body. In 1988, Aguadilla inaugurated the Las Cascadas water park, which included pools with artificial waves that allowed practice of surfing throughout the year. During the summer of 1988, the Department of Natural Resources began a campaign to delimit a stretch of beach from Puerta de Tierra to Isla Verde for vessels only, warning that it was too dangerous for surfing and other aquatic sports. Most beach goers did not heed the warnings and continued riding the waves next to the rocky shore. WSJN-CD began transmitting the OP Pro Surfing events in its programming. In November 1988, the Budweiser-BZ Surf Festival was held at Aviones beach, with José López (Open), José Ponce (Junior), Chris Okelone (Bodyboarding), Charlie Miranda (Longboard and Super Heat), Pablo Díaz (Novice Boys) and Charlie Ortiz (Masters) winning their categories from a field of 87 surfers. In February 1989, the Budweiser Pro-Surf Challenge was held at Jobos beach offered $35,000 in prizes. Out of a group of nine Puerto Ricans, Alberto Licha and Franko Ilarivcci advanced. Now led by Héctor Laffitte Jr. the FSPR held eliminators at the 1989 national championship to select a team to compete in the 1990 World Surfing Championships at Japan.

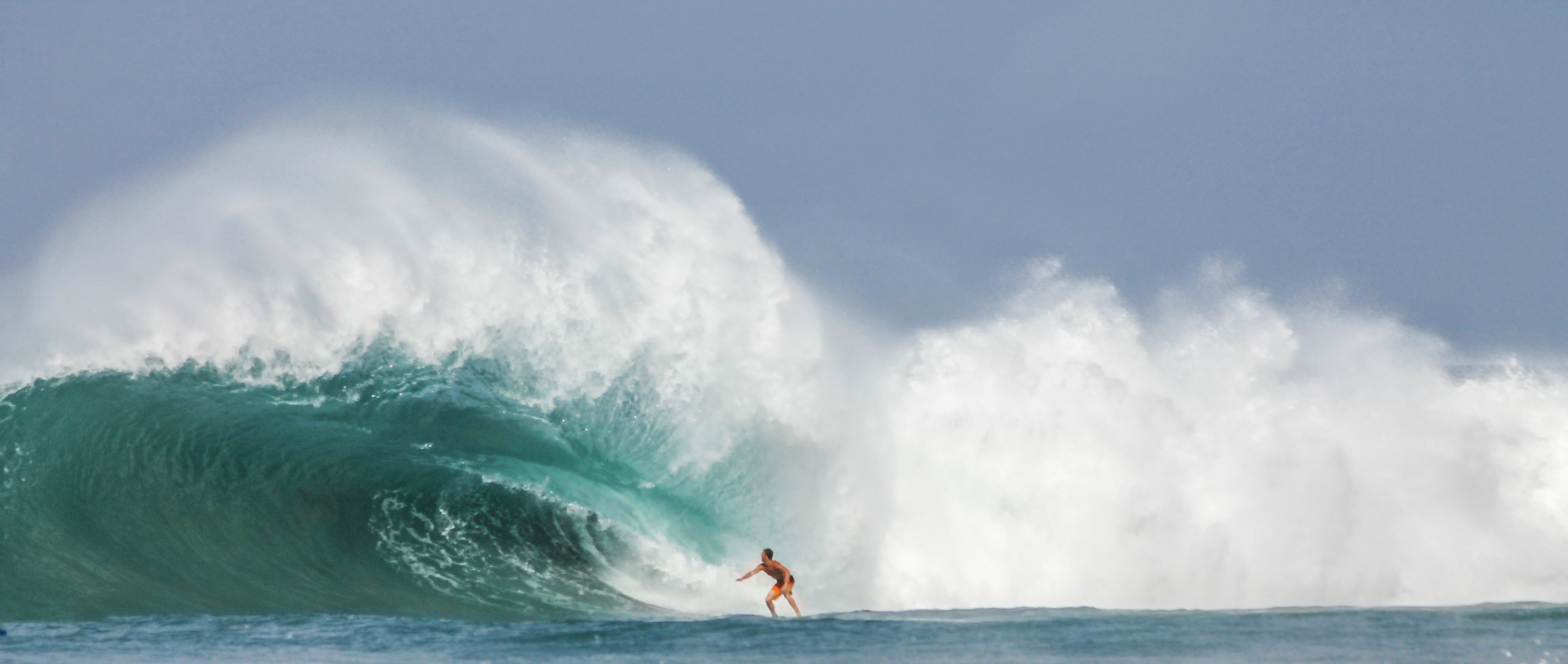
Gas Chambers beach in Aguadilla.

At Luquillo, Parador Martorell offered surfing as one of its perks. About 5,000 tourists were estimated to visit the west coast to surf and participate in other beach sports. Entering the 1990s, surfing remained a sport predominantly practiced among young people and continued being practiced at the traditional spots, along others like La Pared at Luquillo. At La Perla, arrangements were made to establish a commercial workshop to design and sell surfboards. In May 1990, Carlos Cabrera Dávila competed at the World Surfing Championships, having classified and secured a private sponsorship for his participation. In October 1990, the federation sent a team to compete in the sixth edition of the Torneo Internacional Levis featuring Jorge Nido, Onix Vázquez, Willie Vicente and Phillip Bonnett, all in the Open division, Carlos Cabrero and Dalphie Correa (Junior), Becky Taylor (Women), Charlie Miranda (Long Board) and Abner de Arce (Bodyboarding). At that moment, Puerto Rico was 8th in the ISA world rankings. The team finished in the third global position in the tournament, with both Miranda and Taylor finishing third in their respective categories. Álvarez organized the Loka Ola, Oh Henry! Pro at Jobos beach which featured 80 surfers, including top ranked global competitors, and served as the ASP East season closer. Cabrero was sponsored by Alberto Castro and Luis Valladares, who owned the main local surfing brands and traveled abroad. However, following his second participation at the annual Huntington Beach event, Cabrero decided to return to Puerto Rico, citing distaste of what he perceived as "localist favoritism and racism against Latinos" in the United States. Inspired by the Playero brand, a mainstay in the local surfing culture since the 1970s, he created his own in Tres Palmas. At the 1990 Lorchi Pro in Barbados, Juan Ashton defeated Kelly Slater. He continued competing both in local events, the Eastern Surfing Association (ESA) and ASP World Qualifying Series (WQS).

Presided by Guy Ashton, the PRSF focused on establishing an eight district format that heavily focused on the development of younger surfers, including the creation of a grommet division that included athletes that were younger than the traditional teenage competitors. Among the young competitors that arose during this time was Carlos Cabrero. When Steve Fitzpatrick moved to Puerto Rico in 1992 he published his photographs in Surfer magazine, bringing international attention to beaches like Gas Chambers and Tres Palmas. The aesthetic commonly associated with surf culture was predominant among young people, with local chain stores like Kókomo and Bora Bora being established throughout the decade. This trend is tied to the 1960s pioneers in La Bruja (1995), the first documentary produced about the sport in Puerto Rico. Besides being the main subject of this film, Ashton also won the Miller Genuine Draft Surf Cup held at Domes beach and became the region's representative for Volcom, opening its Surf School at Jobos. The surfing community in the western coast led to multigenerational talents joining the sport as well, such as firefighter-turned professional surfer Brian Toth, who was raised in the waters at Jobos. Ricardo Crespo Meléndez became the first Puerto Rican to compete abroad at the Eastern Surfing Association (ESA), before retiring and creating the Ocean Vibes brand.

=== The APSPR and Pro Surf Circuit ===
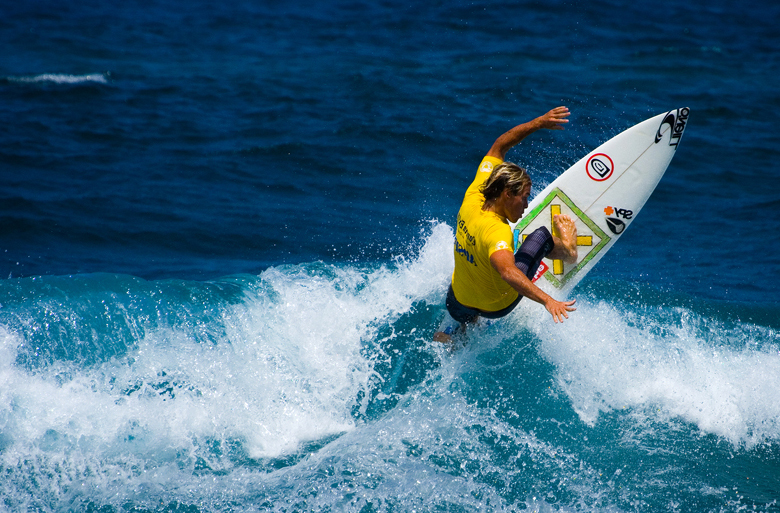
Surfing at the Corona Extra Pro Surf Circuit in Middles beach.

The 2000s opened with Carlos Cabrero's win at the HIC Pipe Pro in Oahu, Hawaii, where he bested world champion Andy Irons and Braden Dias. Prior to this event, no Latin American surfer had manahed to Banzai Pipeline. He and Rob Machado remained the only pair of goofy footers to win at the Pipe Masters for the following decades. The Association of Professional Surfing of Puerto Rico (APSPR) was created in 2001 and initially gathered male athletes that competed within its Men's Pro division. In 2002, Werner Vega approached the directors of Grupo Modelo to sponsor a professional competition, eventually leading to the creation of the Corona Extra Pro Surf Circuit. Carlos Cabrero won consecutive editions of the circuit between 2003-06. During this time, Guillermo Sue-A-Quan became a mainstay at Parada 8, owning the La 8 Surf Shop and its school. Cabrero and Otto Flores were the main surfers in Puerto Rico during the first half of the decade, with Alejandro Moreda first emerging as a junior standout in 2005 and joining them later. In 2007, Brian Toth and Dylan Grave were Top-100 talents in the ASP World Ratings. Domes and María's beach hosted the first edition of the ISA World Masters Surfing Championship. During the 2000s, the Los Gallitos de Ale Moreda youth event began being held at Aviones beach. Ashton competed at the 2008 tournament, winning the event held at Rincón and eliminating defending champion Carlos Santos from Brazil. At that year's Corona Extra Pro Surf Circuit, Cabrero won the national title. Ashton retained the title in the 2009 ISA World Masters Surfing Championship held at Punta Rocas, Peru, defeating Ricardo Toledo in the final.

That year the APSPR established its Women's Pro division, with Alexis Engstrom emerging as an early mainstay and winner of the APSPR national circuit. The Rincon Beachboy Stand-up Paddle, a SUP Race event, was first held. Puerto Rico became a stop in the ASP World Tour, with the 2010 Rip Curl Pro Search first being held at Middles beach and continuing in subsequent years. After moving on to the Grand Masters division, Ashton won another gold medal by defeating Fabio Gouveia of Brazil. He retained in the 2011 ISA World Grand Masters Surfing Championship for his fourth world title. In the 2011 Corona Extra Pro Surf Circuit, Wilfredo Deliz advanced to the semifinals over competition from abroad. Ashton and Cabrero remained consistent finalists at the Corona Extra Pro Surf Circuit, but Brian Toth took over by winning four APSPR national titles with his stronger performance coming during the 2012-13 season. The 2014 season was noted by heavy swells at Domes, with Gabriel Escudero winning the Corona Extra Pro Surf Circuit. Puerto Rico competed at the 2014 ISA 50th Anniversary World Surfing Games, with the team led by Toth and Escudero finishing 8th overall with 6,720 points.

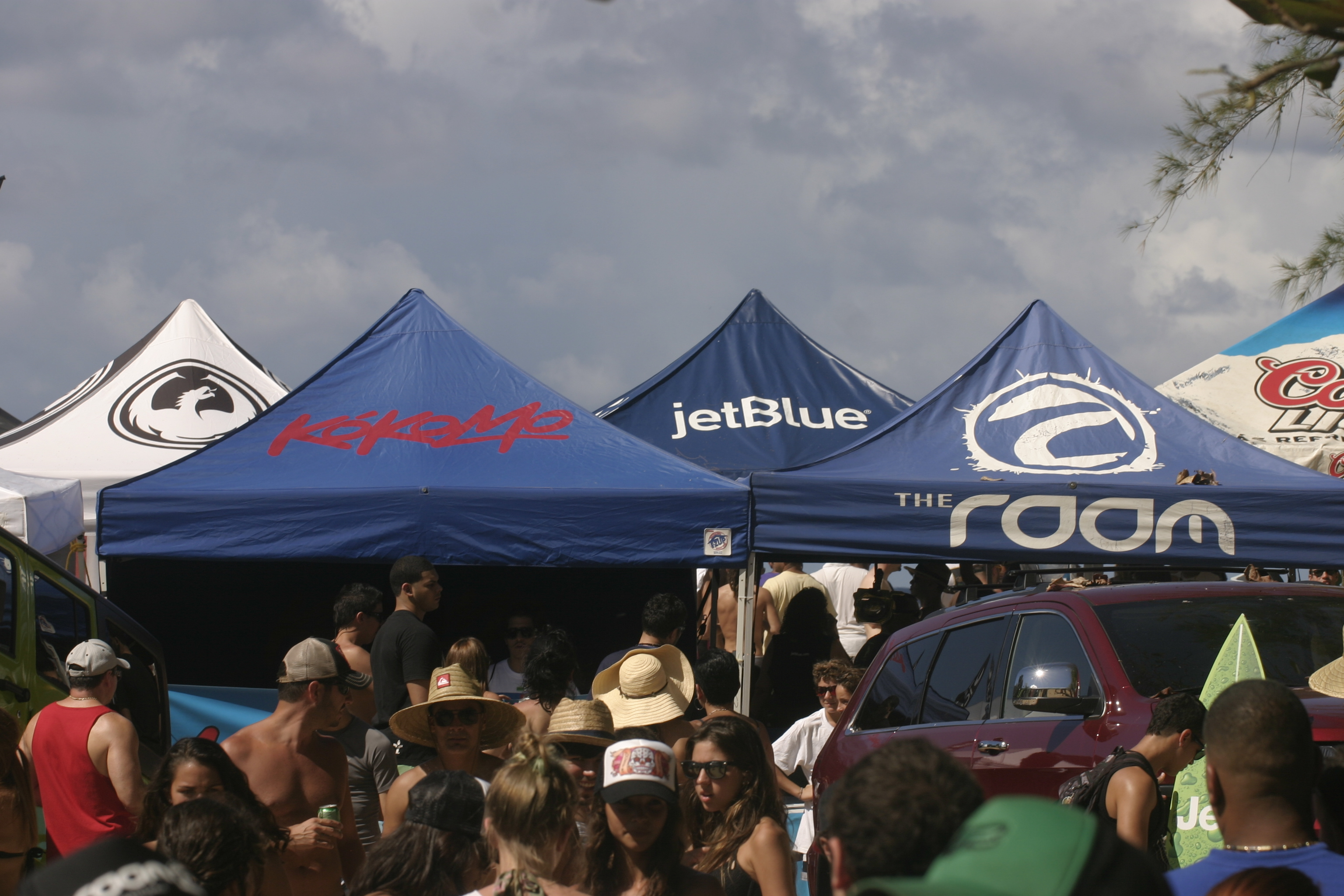
The Rip Curl Pro at Jobos.

A series of swells that took place in 2008 caused weather conditions that gained legendary fame among the surfing community, reaching the ears of international surfers like Raymond King. Throughout the 2010s, the municipality of Vega Baja hosted the Xtreme Cibuco Surfing & Bodyboarding at Puerto Nuevo beach. In 2012-13, Gaby Escudero won the 25th Corona Pro Surf Circuit. During this time, the Encanto Pro event was introduced. Middles beach hosted the 24th Corona Extra Pro Surf Circuit, with prizes of $25,000 for men and $12,000 for women. In December 2013, the final of the Coors Light Puerto Rico Triple Crown of Surfing & Bodyboarding took place with Hector Santamaría, María del Mar González, Miguel Feliciano and Maylene Rivera leading their respective events. By the mid-2010s, the Corona Extra Pro Surf Series was regarded as one of the most important events in Central America and the Caribbean, adopting other features such as the SurfVillage, which included other commodities and artisans. In January 2014, the first Legend Surf Classic Contest brought together veterans like Rafael Negrón, Edwin Mauras, Jason Colberg, Rolando Montes, Guillermo Real, Edgardo Rodríguez, Benji Jorge, Micco Godinez, Jack Roland Murphy (Murf the Surf) and Jonathan Damm in several 40+ categories. In 2013-14, Gabriel Escudero won the Corona Extra Pro Surf Circuit.

In January 2015, Bejamín Jorge, Balsa Bill, Monty Smith, Edwin Maurás Modesti, Charlie Miranda, Gary Fennegan, Susan King, Guille Bermúdez, Nat Young, Stephanie Cabrera, Dick Catri, Barry Church, Mimi Monroe, Edwin Santos, Lester Camp and Cecil Lear participated in the second edition of the Surfing Legend Surf Classic Puerto Rico at Rincón. During this time, the Puerto Rico Triple Crown dominated the local circuit for both surfing and bodyboarding. O’Neill began sponsoring the Corona Extra Pro Surf Circuit. After Jolari Carreas won the Puerto Rico U18 title, she was sponsored by Red Mango and participated in her class at ISA World Junior Surfing Championship (WJSC). That fall, the first edition of the Rincón Surfing Festival was held as an ecotourism initiative. In February 2016, teenagers Yariann del Mar Camacho and Cecilia Silva qualified at the National Junior Surfing Champions and became part of the program. During this time, Domes beach hosted the final of the Pro Surf Series with Brian Toth leading for Puerto Rico. Havanna Cabrero, who had won the Puerto Rico U16 and U18 titles, qualified at the ISA World Junior Championship and climbed to the 15th place in the global rankings. In 2015-16, Alexis Engstrom won the women's division of the Corona Extra Pro Surf Circuit. In March 2016, a bill was introduced in the legislature to include paddle boards among the "acuatic vehicles" category of Ley de Navegación y Seguridad Acuática. Río Donaldson, Sebastián Soto, Juan González, Jolaris Carreras, Havanna Cabrero, Gabriel San Miguel, Axel González, Ignacio Alomnso, Manny Valentín, Yariam Camacho and Cecilia Silva represented Puerto Rico at the 2016 Junior World Championship. The Corona Extra Pro Surf Circuit debuted a media-personality competition.

When surfing was included as an Olympic sport, the FAPR which was then led by José Olmo rejoiced and began reorganizing its structure to accommodate the qualifications. In 2017, a bill to give the police the power to remove surfers and other athletes when the weather conditions worsened was presented by House Speaker Carlos Johnny Méndez, gathered criticism and was ultimately withdrawn. In March 2017, Surfing and Bodyboarding Contest was held at Loíza. Domes beach hosted the 31st Corona Pro Surf Surf Circuit O’Neill Series prior to the strike of hurricane Maria. During the summer of 2017, concerns were raised that developments in the Northwest region could impact the surfing beaches. In response, a bill to create beach protections and create water sports development facilities was introduced before the legislature. At the local level, the municipality of Loíza sponsored the Surfing and Bodyboarding Contest 2017.

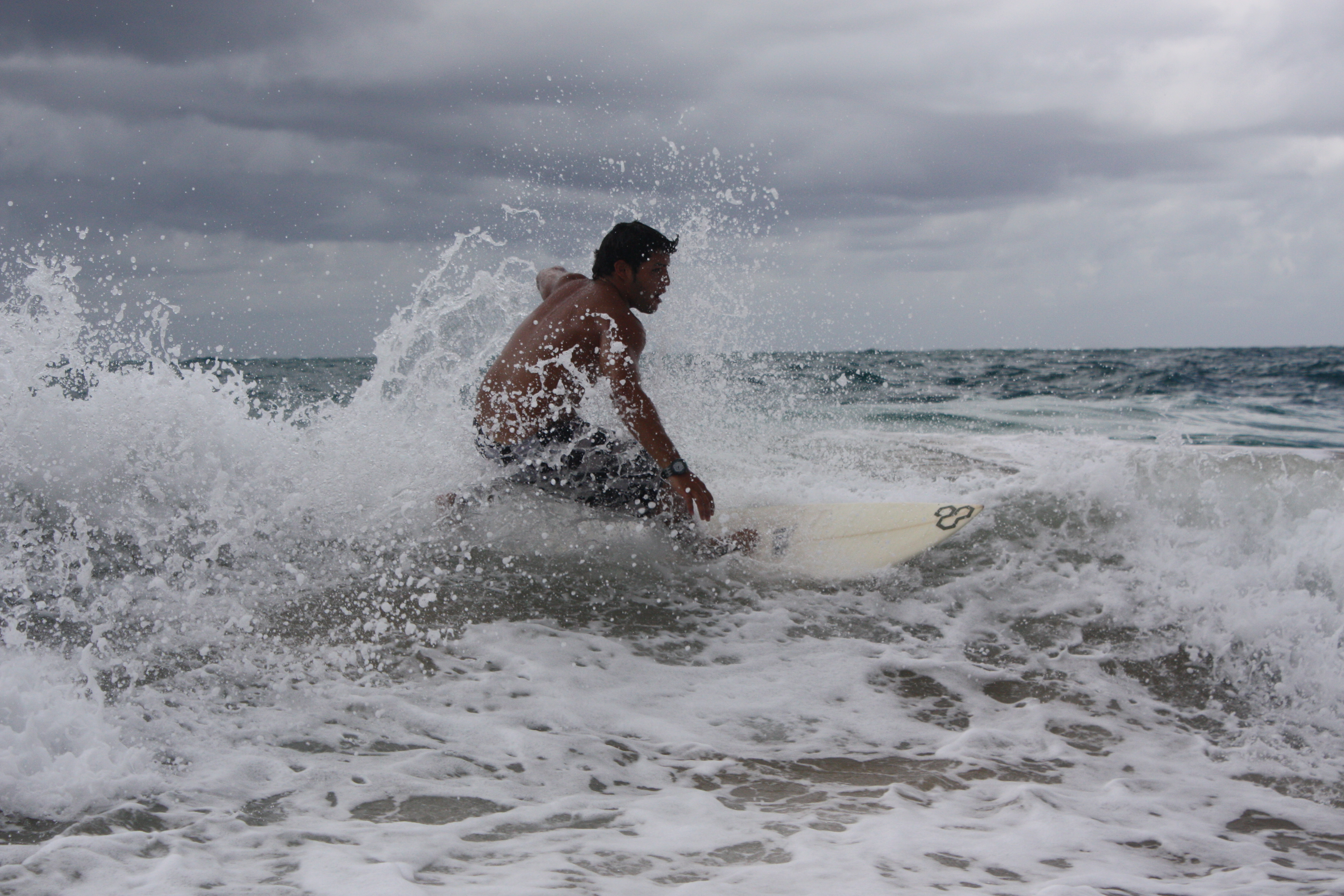
Surfer riding the storm swell of a hurricane in Puerto Rico.

Brian Toth won the 2016-17 Corona Extra Pro Surf Circuit. The close passing of hurricane Irma brought a storm swell that surfers rode, gathering media attention. Later that month, hurricane Maria passed directly over Puerto Rico, causing severe damage to the coast line including various surf spots like Middles, Domes, Jobos and María beach, with surfers joining others to restore them. Several surfers, including Brian Toth, had to temporarily leave the sport during this time. By March 2018, Isabela was ready to host the Corona Extra Pro Surf Circuit, which by its 32nd edition was classified as a two-star event in the region.

Shortly afterwards, Domes beach also served as the base for the 5th Legend Surf Classic with Benjamín Jorge Meléndez, Tony Betancourt, Edgardo Luis Rivera, Alfredo Bernard y Paloma Quintana. That same month, swells brought waves of up to 25 feet in places like Tres Palmas beach, which were enjoyed by both locals and several surfers from abroad. During the summer of 2018, there was movement in the Puerto Rico House of Representatives to create the "Surfing Route", in the west and north coasts (Porta del Sol and Porta Atlántico). In October 2018, the House of Representatives declared municipality of Capital del Deporte del Surfing (lit. "Capital of Surfing"). This was part of a larger initiative to create a tourism route pushed forth by the Puerto Rico Tourism Company and DRD. Brian Toth and Tiarah Blanco won the 32nd Corona Extra Pro Surf Series. At the Corona Extra Pro Surf Circuit, Blanco repeated as champion also winning the back-to-back. In fall, the Dorado Beach Resort hosted a seminar hosted by Greg Long titled "The 2018 Puerto Rico Safety Summit". On the 50th anniversary of the 1968 World Surfing Championships, the Rincón 50 Surf Fest was organized at Domes beach, hosting the World Surf League (WSL) North America Longboard Championships.

=== Olympic Committee affiliation and regional titles ===
Maricarmen Rivera qualified for the 2019 Pan American Games by winning silver in SUP Race at the XIV Pan American Surfing Games (PASA Games). Ricardo Delgado, Blanco, Dave de Armas, Nimsay García and Omelv García qualified as well. By December 2018, surfing had been fully integrated into the Puerto Rico Olympic Committee's (COPUR) structure. On its part, the DRD included the sport into the Juegos de Puerto Rico, an islandwide school-level event. Prior to the 34th Corona Extra Pro Surf Circuit, artist Lorna Hernández unveiled a surfing-themed sculpture depicting and orca, manta ray and sea turtles being overwhelmed by a trash wave in an effort to raise awareness of the global issue of plastics and other contaminants in the world's oceans. In June 2019, Ramsé Morales, Gabriel Canals, Cristina Canals, Darren Muchett, Brandom López, Jaime Pérez, Anthony Luciano , Jorge Soto, Melvin Rosa, Omar Enrique Rosa, Francisco Moret, Ónix Hernández, Luis Arroyo, Aníbal Román, Alexis Rosas, Rafael Rivera, Javier Báez, Martin Velázquez, Gadiel Rodríguez , Héctor Valle and Abner De Arce received a recognition by the legislature of Puerto Rico. At the Pan American Games, De Armas advanced and Rivera won bronze in SUP Race. That year, Toth won the Corona Extra Pro Surf Circuit held at Middles beach.

Max Torres and Maricarmen Rivera received recognitions by the COPUR at the 2019 Olympic Awards. In early 2020, bill P.C. 2307 proposing the creation of a natural reserve at Domes beach was introduced before the legislature, receiving a lukewarm support from the Puerto Rico Department of Natural Resources (DRNA). Despite the impending measures to deal with COVID-19, the 7th Legend Surf Classic was held in January 2020. During the lockdown, surfers led other aquatic athletes in protests held at Paseo Real Marina in Aguadilla and an executive order authoring non-contact water sports was approved shortly afterwards. Ricardo Delgado immediately began pursuing the classification for the Olympics. He joined Havana Cabrero, Faviola Alcalá, Mía Calderón, Dwight Pastrana and Mauricio Díaz Saldaña at the ALAS 4 Estrellas Tour 2020 at El Tunco beach in El Salvador. The event was sanctioned by the Asociación Latinoamericana de Surfistas Profesionales (ALAS). FSPR José Olmo brought Tia Blanco into the national program and she was considered its main player by the COPUR, but his successor favored other candidates that were active in the Circuito Nacional such as Faviola Alcalá, Mía Calderón, Havanna Cabrero and Jolaris Carreras. Pastrana, Alcalá, Carreras and Idalis Alvarado were successful in the 2021 Circuito Nacional, which was intended to prepare the team for upcoming international competitions. In May 2021, Cabrero advanced to the second round at the ISA World Surfing Championships, while Delgado, Dwight Pastrana, Faviola Alcalá Manny Valentín went to the repechage round. Cabrero finished second in her heat, while Pastrana and Delgado won their heats to continue in contention. Ultimately, Pastrana and Alcalá were the final two surfers left for the team. During the summer, Alejandro Moreda was a participant in ABC's The Ultimate Surfer.

With the Olympic inclusion the FSPR and its new president, Oscar Martínez Borrás, emphasized the importance of the Circuito Nacional for the development. In March 2022, Cabrero finished fifth at the SLO CAL Open. She then competed at the Ron Jon Roxy Pro in Cocoa Beach, Florida. The following month, she finished third at the Barbados Surf Pro. By doing so, Cabrero became the first Puerto Rican woman to qualify for the Challenger Series. The team of Omelv García, Nimsay García, Ricardo Ávila, Torres, De Armas and Cabrero finished fifth at the 2022 PASA Games. FSPR president Oscar Martínez announced that the 2022 edition of the event was granted a cive-star classification by the Asociación Latinoamericana de Surfistas Profesionales (ALAS) and awarded ranking points, which made them eligible in the qualification for the Pan American Games. The ISA organized the 2022 Stand Up Paddleboarding World Championships at Puerto Rico. Maricarmen Rivera won the bronze medal in SUP Sprint Race while Ricardo Ávila finished fourth in Technical Paddle Surf. One month after this event, the FSPR began approaching the ISA about bringing another edition of the ISA World Surfing Championships. A surfing team was fielded for the inaugural Juegos Centroamericanos y del Caribe Mar y Playa in 2022. In December 2022, 13-year old Alelí Medina won gold in the adapted surfing category at the ISA World Para Surfing Championship, sweeping all of her heats and unseating three-time British world champion Melissa Reid in the final. The team of Dwight Pastrana, Ricardo Delgado, Brian Toth, Sage Katz, Giancarlos Méndez, Havanna Cabrero, Mia Calderón, Jolari Carreras, Miamar Soto and Mya Kuzmovich competed at the ISA World Surfing Games (WSG) held at Arecibo. By 2023, the Circuito Nacional featured young surfers such as Cabrero, Nico Epps, Faviola Alcalá and Sage Katz.

In September 2023, Max Torres won gold in the SUP Surf category of the ISA Standup Paddle World Championships. Carlos Cabrero, who continued surfing well after retiring from professional competition, suffered a serious accident while doing so at Arecibo. The 37th edition of the Corona Pro Surf Circuit at Middles beach featured the debut of Sage Katz in the open category. Brian Toth advanced to the final. The COPUR announced the creation of a water sports training and development center at Toa Baja. In the 2023 Pan American Games, Maricarmen Rivera won the bronze medal in SUP Race. In November 2023, Alelí Medina repeated the gold medal at the ISA World Para Surfing Championship, once again defeating Melissa Reid in the final. In February 2024, La Marginal beach at Arecibo hosted the Circuito Nacional, which was won by Brian Toth and Jolari Carreras. This was held in anticipation for the 2024 ISA World Surfing Championships held at the same location, where 55 nations participated and Puerto Rico fielded the team of Brian Toth, Dwight Pastrana, Ricardo Delgado, Havanna Cabrero, Mía Calderón and Jolari Carreras. In the event, Toth won his matchup with two-time world champion Filipe Toledo of Brazil and Marco Mignot of France to advance to quarterfinals. Prior to the event, artist Abast painted a mural at La Marginal. In September 2024, the beach hosted the La Marginal Pro event, which was a qualifier for the ISA World Surf League. The Corona Extra Pro Surf Circuit also returned at Isabela during this month, with Cabrero emerging victorious in the women's division. Maricarmen Rivera won the SUP Race category at the Pan American Surfing Games 2024. In November 2024, Alelí Medina won her third consecutive gold at the ISA World Para Surfing Championship, this time defeating Ling Pai of Canada in the final.

In January 2025, the 11th Legend Surf Classic was staged at Rincón with José Álvarez, Zoraida Pagán, Carlos Bonaparte, Ricky Bloomquist, Pedro Escobar, Edgar Hernández, Héctor Lafitte, Herminio Pagán Calderín, Víctor L. Serrano, Carlos M. Ramos and Víctor Torres Collazo in the lineup. The 2025 Circuito Nacional closed with Nicholas Epps and Jolari Carreras as national champions. Puerto Rico finished second at the 2025 PASA Games, with Luz Grande winning gold in Bodyboarding and the duo of Maricarmen Rivera and Ricardo Ávila winning both divisions of the SUP Surf Race. For the 2025 ISA World Surfing Championships, the young duo of Sage Katz and Jean Carlos Méndez replaced Dwight Pastrana and Ricardo Delgado. In October and November, La Marginal beach hosted stops for the ALAS Pro Tour and World Surf League Qualifying Series. During this month, Max Torres and Maricarmen Rivera won the SUP Surf silver medals at the ISA Stand Up Paddle World Championships. In December 2025, Miamar Soto Pérez and Amari Mia Moore earned Top-10 finishes at the ISA Junior World Surfing Championships. Mariecarmen Rivera concluded by being voted the "Athlete of the Year" by the media, the first time that a surfer was considered the top performer in Puerto Rico. At the PASA Games 2026, Maricarmen Rivera repeated as champion of the SUP Race. In 2026, the University of Puerto Rico at Mayagüez's UPRM Surf Association held its first intramural competition at Domes beach. That season, Arecibo hosted one of the stops in the Circuito Nacional at Xuxa Spot beach. Max Torres won the bronze medal at SUP Surf in the men's side. Manatí hosted the 2026 festival at Los Tubos Beach Surf Complex, which marked the reopening of the venue. At the 2026 Central American and Caribbean Games, Mariecarmen Rivera and Nimsay García won the gold and silver medals of the SUP Surf division. Jazmine Dean won silver in Longboard and Max Torres won bronze in men's SUP Surf.

== Outside competition ==
=== Surf spots and geological factors ===
Unlike other regions in the Caribbean where waves are comparatively flat, the presence of the Puerto Rico Trench amplifies the swells that reach the northern coast, which creates a "consistent [but] not giant surf [towards the] Atlantic. During the winter, low pressure systems coming from the continental landmass further contributes to this pattern, on occasion bringing larger waves. In spring, the trade winds bring consistent but milder surf. During the summer, cold fronts coming in from the South American winter and the occasional passage of tropical waves, tropical storms and hurricanes due to the increase in sea temperature bring swells throughout the archipelago. According to the government, 46% of tourists visiting Puerto Rico came to practice water sports. Biologist Carlos Gastón compared the beaches at Boquerón favorably to the best surfing sites at Hawaii. Dwight Pastrana, who lived several years and surfed in Hawaii, agreed and considered Puerto Rico its Caribbean equivalent in terms of natural potential for the sport. At Aguadilla the El Mix, Pressure Point, Wishing Wells and Playuela are considered surging spots. Playa Chatarra in Loíza and Survival Beach in Aguadilla have been noted for their reef breaks. In the southern region, places like Inches beach became known for being favorable for surfing. Other parts of the Puerto Rican archipelago in which surfing is practiced include Flamenco beach in Culebra. In the eastern coast, the surfing spots include La Monseratte beach at Luquillo. Sea Grant launched a portal, Surfeando Puerto Rico, to track the best waves on the island. Oceanic engineer Miguel Canals Silander created the WaveMaps app, which tracked where conditions were ideal for surfing or fishing. The Waveoz FlowRider simulator installed at Arroyo Surfing Park was the first of its class in the Caribbean.

=== Environmental protection and social causes ===
The nature of the sport completely integrated the athletes with their surroundings and occasionally surfers interact with the local ocean fauna, such as humpback whales or the great hammerhead shark. Athletes also practice the sport in beaches frequently used by the leatherback turtle to lay their eggs. As such, the Asociación Profesional de Surfing de Puerto Rico (APSPR) joined forces with environmental organizations like Save the Beach Puerto Rico and Better World. Fundación Surfrider Puerto Rico was specifically created to help protect coral reefs and beaches. The APSPR has incorporated various initiatives into its events, including recycling and the preservation of endangered species like the Atlantea tulita. The Corona Extra Pro Surf Circuit O'Neill Series debuted the Corona SunRise Save the Beach. The Save the Beach initiative has been tied to the Corona Extra Pro Surf Circuit for years. In 2020, a surfboard built from plastic bottles by Marcos Daniel Cruz Vicens reached the finals of the Vissla + Surfrider Creators & Innovators Upcycle Contest. Surf 4 D.E.M. and the Atlantic Surf & Bodyboarding School offered adapted classes for children with autism, Down's syndrome and other conditions. In 2022, the Museo de Arte de Puerto Rico hosted the Surf Film Series to raise funds for these non-profits. In January 2019, Save the Waves unanimously voted to include the Punta Borinquen area (including Crash Boat and Surfer's Beach) as its eleventh world surf reserve.

== National teams ==
=== Adult ===
- Puerto Rico men's national surfing team
- Puerto Rico women's national surfing team
