= Camalia Valdés =

Puerto Rican businessman

- Born: October 14, 1972 (age 53); San Juan, Puerto Rico
- Occupations: Former president and CEO of Cerveceria India, Inc.

Notes
- She is a sponsor of "El Museo de Arte de Puerto Rico" (The Art Museum of Puerto Rico)

Camalia Valdés (born October 14, 1972) is a Puerto Rican business leader who was the president and CEO of Cerveceria India, Inc., Puerto Rico's largest brewery for 15 years.

== Early years ==
Valdés was born in San Juan, Puerto Rico. Her grandfather was Alfonso Valdés Cobián, who in 1937, together with his brothers, Sabino and Ramón Valdés founded Cerveceria India, Inc. (Indian Brewery) in the City of Mayagüez. Her grandfather, who was the chairman and president of the company, was a successful leader whose leadership converted the company into Puerto Rico's largest beer brewery and manufacture of canned and bottled soft drinks. When her grandfather died in 1988, her grandmother Grace Valdes over the company.

As a child she would often visit the company's manufacturing plant, where she would spend most of her time. In 1994, she earned a degree in liberal arts with a minor in legal studies from Trinity College in Hartford, Connecticut. Valdés continued her legal studies in the Interamerican University of Puerto Rico and in 1998, earned her Juris Doctor degree.

== Cerveceria India ==
Valdés practiced law for a short time before joining the company in the position of manager of operations. She implemented new production methods and was responsible for improving the manufacturing plants infrastructure.

In 2002, Valdés was named president of the company. Under her leadership, "Malta India", a malt beverage, became most sold in Puerto Rico and the sales of Medalla Light, one of the company's beer brands, increased. The company, which is Puerto Rico's largest beer brewery, is also the manufacture of canned and bottled soft drinks.

Valdés vision was to increase her company's local marketshare and to successfully export the company's product overseas. She oversaw the investment of $24 million in the expansion of the company's manufacturing facilities with the aim of increasing manufacturing production by 60%. With the renovations, which were finished in 2008, Cerverceria India is amongst the most technically advanced breweries in Latin America.

== Political controversy ==
In 2008, a newspaper investigation claimed that Valdés and "Coca-Cola de Puerto Rico" President Alberto de la Cruz were allegedly involved in a scheme which included illegal donations made by the Coca-Cola de Puerto Rico and Cervecería India to the political campaign of then Resident Commissioner of Puerto Rico Luis Fortuño who was running for Governor of Puerto Rico. According to the accusations, Fortuño and his wife, Lucé Vela, reported having received $90,000 from SDA Global as income on their 2004 income taxes. The income was allegedly paid by both companies for legal services which Fortuño's wife never provided and instead were secretly funneled as donations. Valdés denied the allegations and nothing came of the accusations.

== Personal life ==
Camalia Valdés lives in San Juan with her husband Craig T. Hylwa. According to an interview with Dennis Costa Pacheco, Valdés sponsors projects in education that promote innovation and new ways of thinking. She is a sponsor of the Museum of Art of Puerto Rico.

== See also ==
- List of Puerto Ricans
- Cerveceria India
- History of women in Puerto Rico
