= Senator Cobián =

Senator Cobián may refer to:

- Alfonso Valdés Cobián (1890–1988), Senate of Puerto Rico
- Ramón Valdés Cobián (1886–1962), Senate of Puerto Rico
