= Beach volleyball in Puerto Rico =

- Country: Puerto Rico
- Governing body: Puerto Rican Volleyball Federation
- National team: Puerto Rico
- Nickname: VoliPlaya
- First played: June 2, 1979

International competitions
- FIVB Beach Volleyball World Championships; NORCECA Beach Volleyball Tour; Central American and Caribbean Games; Pan American and Caribbean Games; Summer Olympics

Due to the tropical weather of the Caribbean and the late-19th Century introduction of indoor volleyball to the islands, beach volleyball was played informally and recreationally in Puerto Rico for decades. However, it was not formally organized into competitions until the 1970s, evolving into a fixture of the larger beach festival scene that combined sports, music and culture. By the 1990s, beach volleyball became professionalized and international tournaments were recurrently held and played for monetary prizes. With the organization of the NORCECA Tour, the Puerto Rico International Open being the main competition for the local teams playing in the circuit. Puerto Rico has been a perennial regional medalist in both men's and women's competition, with the latter being two-time champions of the Central American and Caribbean Games. The program's first Olympic appearance was at Athens 2004 with the duo of Raúl Papaleo and Ramón Hernández.

== History ==
=== Beginnings (1979–1990) ===
During the 1970s, Ricky Amon became involved in the California beach volleyball scene while studying abroad at UCLA, later joining Edwin Fernández and Ángel Peña and competing at Australia. The first Torneo de Voleibol Playero was sponsored by the municipality of San Juan and Hotel la Concha and held at the Condado Convention Center with up to 100 three-player teams in categories beginning at 14+ years of age. The games was also integrated to other disciplines such as the Tercer Torneo de Esquí Acuático, a water skiing tournament held at Boquerón beach. Both San Juan and La Concha sponsored the second edition of the Torneo de Voleibol Playero, which featured changes in rules by admitting three-player mixed teams in the 15U division. Entering the 1980s the municipality of Manatí began hosting the Festival Playero de Verano, which featured a wide array of artistic shows and other events, including beach volleyball, open sea marlin fishing, beach tennis, hobbie cat and wind surfing.

The Olas y Arenas restaurant began sponsoring tournaments at Playa Montones in Isabela, offering rewards for the winners. The Palace Hotel hosted the Primer Festival de Deportes, Maratón y Voleibol Playero at San Juan. The third edition of the Festival Playero was hosted by the municipality of Toa Alta at Playa Levittown and was the first edition to take place in the vicinity of the Metropolitan Region. When the event returned to Manatí for its fourth edition, it had grown to have parts of its lineup transmitted by the American Broadcasting Company's (ABC) Wide World of Sports, with beach volleyball remaining one of the main sports in its lineup being competed in tournament format. By the mid-1980s the west coast had a well developed practice of the sport, with national volleyball team player Alex Torres arguing in favor of organizing a federative tournament. As beach tournaments began offering cash prizes in the thousands, they attracted the attention of high impact players like César Vélez, Billy Muñoz, José Díaz, Rigo Guilloty, Luis Rentas and Sigfredo Borges, who even gave them priority over the practices for the NORCECA tournaments.

Meanwhile, Hotel La Concha and the municipal government of San Juan reached its ninth edition at the Condado Convention Center, with the minimum age being 14 years. In 1987, Playa Los Tubos de Manatí hosted the final of the tournament. During the summer of 1988, the municipality of Manatí sponsored the Retorno a la Arena event, which included a one-day beach volleyball circuit. The second of the Torneo de Voleibol Playero was held at the Sands Hotel and Casino Beach Resort at Isla Verde and hosted 15 teams from abroad in both men's and women's categories. Among those participating was Rafael del Valley, who was a wallyball champion abroad and campaigned in favor of expanding the beach volleyball scene in Puerto Rico, arguing that the conditions of the island would allow it to compete one-on-one against the United States and be lucrative for its players. The third edition was also held at Isla Verde and grew to include an artistic show featuring the groups RPM and O'Brasil with the final being held at Guajacata for $6,000.

Retorno a la Arena continued being celebrated and beach volleyball attracted over 50 teams, which held qualifying events in their towns before participating in the finals at Boquerón. The Primera Bicicletada de Verano Familiar, a summer bicyclist event, concluded with a tournament at Puerta de Tierra. The V Festival Playero was held at La Playita. This was followed by the first Copa Kofresí organized by player Ángel Peña and held at Parque Kofresí at Caguas, a municipality with no beach. The best 16 teams in Puerto Rico were invited, with the duos of Victor Aponte and Jorge Pérez, David Donate and Leonel Martínez, Roberto Ramos and Angel Peña, Enrique López and José LuisDíaz Jr., Tito de León and Rick Stepanoff, Pelegrín Vargas and Noel Serrano, Carlos Nieves and Guillo Silva, Fabio Posada and Tomitón García and Pedro Delgado & David Trautman being confirmed. Other approaches were made to Edwin Fernández, another international player that was playing at Australia during that season.

=== First international events (1990–1992) ===
In August 1990, the Sands Hotel and Casino hosted the first edition of the NORCECA International Cup which offered prizes up to $25,000. Víctor Aponte and José Pérez, professional players for the Plataneros de Corozal, were the top ranked players in Puerto Rico at the moment and were in the run for one of four entries allowed due to hosting the event, but had to win the spot at the Retorno a la Arena event, where 16 teams played a round robin. Other teams from the region included the Netherlands Antilles, Cuba, Canada, the Dominican Republic and Mexico, of which only the former had fielded teams in the style. There was uncertainty with the participation of the United States and the team was ultimately excluded, being replaced by another local team. Perez and Aponte were desgnated Puerto Rico 1, while Willie de Jesús and Carlos Nieves were Puerto Rico 2, David Trautman and Pedro Delgado were Puerto Rico 3 and Ángel Peña and Roberto Ramos were Puerto Rico 4. Puerto Rico 3 finished fourth and was followed by Puerto Rico 2 and Puerto Rico 1.

In September Peña organized another event at Parque Kofresí and offered a prize of $3,000. The entries included Pedro Delgado & David Trautman, Hiram Padilla & Peña, Víctor Aponte & Roberto Ramos, Carlos Nieves & Guillermo Silva, David Donate & Leonel Martínez with the intent of depurating the rankings. Peña and Padilla became the de facto organizers of the beach volleyball discipline and traveled abroad seeking both international affiliation and participation in the FIVB Beach Volleyball World Championships. Willie de Jesús was expected to compete for Puerto Rico in its first participation at the global event in August 1991. In December 1990, the Caribbean Pro Am Volleyball Championships began at El Escambrón with a prize of $12,000 and divided in two groups, one organizing the locals in an eliminator and another including teams from San Thomas, St. Marteen, Cancún, Bahamas, Aruba and the Cayman Islands.

=== Puerto Rico Open (1992–1996) ===
Isla Verde became a recurrent host for international events, with the Women's WPVA Coors Light Beach Volley '92, which offered a $50,000 prize and was played in April 1992. The adjacent Balneario de Carolina hosted another edition of the tournament, with the same reward amount the following year. The 1994 season opened with the Women's Coors Light Beach Volley '94 at Isla Verde, this time with a reward of $40,000. During the summer, the same beach hosted the Men's AVP Miller Puerto Rico Open, which offered a reward of $75,000. That season ended with the Puerto Rico Opens, tournaments that were part of the FIVB World Tour, in both branches. On the men's side a reward of $100,000 was offered and local teams Obin Méndez & Joel Pérez and Carlos Nieves & Luis Rodríguez competed, while the women's tournament featured six teams with Moncha Cruz & Xiomara Molero leading.

The 1995 Puerto Rico Opens were played at the Balneario de Carolina and repeated the $100,000 prize, this edition featured the participation of national mainstay Ramón Hernández on the men's side, competing Enrique López along several local teams including Bob Casanova & David and Quiñonez & Edwin Fernández. The women's tournament offered $50,000 and Sheila Conley Díaz & Xiomara Molero led a group of five Puerto Rican teams. The following year, the Puerto Rico Open's prize rose to $150,000 on the men's draw and another prominent national program member, Raúl Papaleo, competed along Amaury Velasco and led a group of eight local duos. Among the women the reward was set at $300,000 with Cruz & Molero leading a field of four Puerto Rican duos. While no other opens were hosted at Puerto Rico for the remainder of the decade, Ramón Hernández, Raúl Papaleo, Amaury Velasco, Willie de Jesús and others continued active in the international circuit and tournaments continued being held locally led by the annual Festival Playero at Los Tubos.

=== Regional tournaments and Olympic debut (1997–2010) ===
At the 1998 Central American and Caribbean Games held at Maracaibo, Venezuela, the regional event held its inaugural beach volleyball tournament and the program fielded two teams coached by Ángel Peña, with Willie de Jesús and Amaury Velasco winning bronze after being among the first beach volleyball teams to receive economic support from the Puerto Rico Olympic Committee (COPUR). The duo of Elaine López and Sheila Conley finished fourth on the women's side. De Jesús and Velasco also competed at the 1999 Pan American Games at Winnipeg, Canada. Also coached by Peña, Raúl Papaleo & Ramón Hernández joined as a team prior to the 2002 Central American and Caribbean Games held at San Salvador, El Salvador. The duo won the event's tournament, the first championship for the national program at the CACG. In this event, the duo of Lyann Puig & Yamileska Yantín competed in the women's division. Papaleo & Hernández participated at the 2003 Pan American Games hosted by Santo Domingo, Dominican Republic, winning the event't bronze medal. The FIVB World Tour returned to Puerto Rico with the 2004 Men's Carolina Open at Isla Verde, where they competed for $180,000 in prizes. The duo continued participation in the circuit abroad and gathered enough ranking points to qualify for the 2004 Summer Olympic Games at Athens, Greece. Papaleo & Hernández entered the tournament as the 21st seed, marking the first time that Puerto Rico competed in the discipline at that level.

Puig & Yantín returned for the 2006 Central American and Caribbean Games at Cartagena. In May 2007, the NORCECA Beach Volleyball Circuit was held at Isla Verde. The women's side was won by the team of Yamileska Yantín & Yarleen Santiago, while Abdel Otero & Juan Rivera carried the silver on the men's division. In the 2008 edition, Papaleo and Hernández won a men's tournament where Puerto Rican teams also won silver and bronze, while Yarleen Santiago & Sheila Conley won the bronze in the women's division. At the 2010 Beach Volleyball Circuit Boquerón stop, Yarleen Santiago & Dariam Acevedo won the silver medal. This town also hosted the beach volleyball tournament of the 2010 Central American and Caribbean Games whose main base was Mayagüez, with Santiago and Acevedo winning silver on the women's side and the men's team of Orlando Irizarry & Roberto Rodríguez bronze. Santiago and Acevedo won four of the NORCECA Tour stops that year, Cayman Islands, Dominican Republic and Chiapas. The Liga Atlética Interuniversitaria incorporated men's beach volleyball to its lineup in 2012-13 and women in 2013–14, with the games being played at the Cabo Rojo Beach Volleyball Courts.

=== NORCECA and first CACG title (2010–2023) ===
On the men's side, Roberto Rodríguez became a regular at the NORCECA Tour, winning the Cayman Islands stop with Erick Haddock and the Guatemala stop with Pablo Guzmán in 2012. On her part, Santiago switched partners for Yamilesca Yantín and won the Mayagüez and Boca Chica stops that year. The duo competed at the 2011 Pan American Games at Guadalajara, winning the tournament's bronze medal. Sergio Figueroa and Daniel competed at the 2014 Summer Youth Olympics held at Nanjing, finishing in fifth place. On the girl's side, Lina Bernier-Valeria Cajigas represented Puerto Rico. In 2017, accomplished court player Áurea Cruz entered the arena trying to transition to the beach. Following the strike of hurricane Maria the program went dormant until January 2018, when the federation held a three-week youth tournament at Ocean Park named Torneo Nacional de Menores de Voleibol de Playa with competition in the U-12, U-14, U-16 and U-18 categories to het ready for the international season. That year the LAI made its return to Ponce, which left the venue for beach volleyball ambiguous. The finals were ultimately played at UPR Río Piedras.

At the 2018 Central American and Caribbean Games, Puerto Rico fielded Allanis Navas & María González and Cristian Encarnación & Daniel Quiñones. The women, who were coached by Erick Haddock, debuted by defeating Jamaica. On the men's side, Encarnación and González opened with a win over Jamaica (21–15, 21–15). In the 2018 Summer Youth Olympics, the duo of Allanis Navas and María González represented Puerto Rico and finished fifth. Both competed with separate schools, Academia Discípulos de Cristo (Navas) and Colegio Piaget (González), at the Campeonato Nacional de Voleibol Escolar held at Complejo de Voleibol Borinquen Coquí in Cupey, San Juan. For the 2019 Noche de San Juan celebration, the municipality of Manatí organized the Mar Chiquita Volley Fest. During this time, Encarnación joined Juan Carlos Ribas and finished fifth in a NORCECA Tour event at Boca Chica, Dominican Republic.

The COVID-19 pandemic affected the NORCECA itinerary and forced González to improvise a workout routine at home which included using a wall for self-peppering during the initial quarantine phase. Despite this, the program continued focused on qualifying for the 2020 Summer Olympics and received the support of the Puerto Rico Olympic Committee (COPUR) towards this goal. In January 2021, Ramón Hernández was named director of the program by the FPV. The full practice of beach volleyball wasn't authorized until March 2021. When the teams returned, the problem in physical condition was noted. Navas and González continued working towards the classification, while Cristian Encarnación, Josué Rivera, Juan Carlos Ribas, Kevin Rodríguez and Pablo Guzmán were included in a preselection on the men's side. The women's lost a game to Cuba that would have given them the pass to the Olympic qualifying game, but climbed to the fourth place in the NORCECA ranking. Along Lara Torruella & Lina Bernier, they won the bronze medal. On the men's side, Kevin Rodríguez & Cristian Encarnación reached the semifinals and carried the bronze medal by winning their series over Guatemala. The COPUR also inaugurated the Festival Olímpico de Playa at the Balneario de Carolina, which included beach volleyball and other beach and water sports. In July 2021, Navas & González defeated Mexico (21–19, 21–12) to win gold at the U23 Pan American Qualifier, with William Rivera & Randall Santiago defeating Nicaragua (21–8, 21–18) to win bronze and classify. In November 2021, the program participated at the inaugural Junior Pan American Games held at Cali, Colombia. Navas and González defeated Guatemala (21–14, 21–13) in the quarterfinals, Mexico (21–12, 21–18) in the semifinals on route to winning the silver medal. Towards the year's end, the government privatized the Bahía Urbana area of the San Juan Bay as part of a project that included infrastructure to play beach volleyball. In January 2022, beach volleyball was used as a protest tool by young people reaffirming the free access of the public beach at Ocean Park, which had been obstructed by a foreign home owner of the area, at the Ocean Wepalooza event.

During this time, J.J. Barea began the construction of a multi-sport training complex named JUMP at Hato Rey, which included facilities for the sport. Longtime court player Lynda Morales also began a crossover into beach volleyball. In April 2022, Ribas and Kevin Rodríguez participated in the qualifying for the FIVB Beach Volleyball World Championships, defeating El Salvador in two sets during the quarterfinals. Both Navas and González used the NCAA offseason to prepare for the Olympic qualification, beginning the 2022 NORCECA Tour with a second place at the Mexico stop. The Festival Olímpico de Playa returned for its second edition, including the sport. At the 2022 Juegos Centroamericanos y del Caribe de Mar y Playa held at Santa Marta, Navas & González defeated Surinam, the United States Virgin Islands (21–3, 21–5) and Colombia (21–6, 21–12) to win its group, finishing with the bronze. On the boy's side the representatives were Frank Roark & Lorenzo Rivera, son of volleyball mainstay Víctor River. González and Navas closed the NORCECA season by winning the silver medal at Punta Cana.

Beach volleyball was included in the lineup of the Departamento de Recreación y Deportes's (DRD) 2023 International Series. During the 2023 LAI season, the games were moved to Mayagüez. In May 2023, the Circuito Playero del Departamento de Recreación y Deportes was held at Añasco. Navas and González participated in the 2023 season of the NORCECA circuit, finishing fifth at the Varadero stop and winning the Cayman Islands stop over Guatemala (21–14, 21–15). In June, the team won an U23 competition held at Punta Cana and the world cup regional qualifier, besting the United States (18–21, 21-17 y 15–11), Dominican Republic and Canada. Navas and González entered the Volleyball World Beach Pro Tour, playing at the Belgium and Canada stops. On the men's side, the program was fed by LVS players like Cristian Encarnación.

Competing at the 2023 Central American and Caribbean Games hosted by San Salvador, El Savador, Navas and González closed the group phase 4–0 after defeating Colombia in the round closer (21–6, 21–6). In the semifinales, the team defeated Mexico (20–22, 18-21 and 15–9). In the final, Puerto Rico defeated the Dominican Republic (19–21, 21-11 and 15–12) to win the first adult regional championship for the national beach volleyball program. On the men's side, Kevin Rodríguez & Josué Rivera finished second in its group and advanced to the quarterfinals but lost to CCS-Guatemala (21–19, 16–21, 16–18) and lost the bronze medal game to Cuba (21–16, 21–14).

In the NORCECA Tour, Navas and González won the Santos Domingo stop by besting the United States (23-21 and 21–11) having previously defeated the Dominican Republic and Nicaragua. The team then made its debut at the FIVB Beach Volleyball World gaining its first win over Switzerland (13–21, 22-20 and 15–13), but losing to the Netherlands (21-11 and 21–18) and Canada (19-21 and 12–21). Navas and González opened the 2023 Pan American Games by defeating Colombia (21-15 and 21–10), El Salvador (21-16 and 21–11) and Ecuador (21–17, 21–14) to advance. The team lost the quarterfinal to Mexico (17–21, 21-12 and 15–11), .

=== NORCECA Tour title and CACG repeat (2024–present) ===
The 2024 season of the LAI beach volleyball tournament continued being held at Paseo Litoral Isarael "Shorty" Castro de Mayagüez, being featured in the Festival Deportivo. The Tarzanes of the RUM and Taínas of UAGM won this event. Coached by a returning Ángel Peña Navas and González advanced to the NORCECA Preolympic Tournament, while the men's team fielded a young team composed by Arnaldo Torres& William Rivera. At the Juan Dolio stop, the team opened by besting St. Vincent and the Grenadines (21–7, 21–5) and Surinam (21–3, 21–3). The same town hosted the 2024 NORCECA Continental Tour Final, where Navas and González competed. The 34th edition of the Voleibol Playero at Puerto Nuevo qualified the youth winners to the Caribbean Beach Volleyball Championship. Meanwhile, the municipality of Ponce built new infrastructure for the sport as part of its La Guancha Food Park reconstruction project following the 2019–20 Puerto Rico earthquakes.

Resuming the NORCECA Tour at the Juan Dolio stop, Navas and González won in undefeated fashion without losing a single set by defeating two teams from the United States, Corinne Quiggle & Megan Rice (21-17 y 21–18) and Kelly Kool & Tiffany Svenssohn (21-9 y 21–7), and Mexico (21–19, 21–19) in the final. This was followed by another win at the Puerto Cortes event, Navas and González defeated Mexico (21-16 and 21–17) in the final finishing with a 6–0 record and only losing a single set. At the Ciudad Madero stop, the team won its third consecutive tournament by defeating Mexico (21-18 and 21–19) in the final. Rivera and Rosich also won the men's side, defeating Nicaragua (21–17, 20-22 and 15–7) in the semifinal and the United States in the final (21-12 and 24–22).

Navas was also part of the Texas Christian University (TCU) Horned Frogs team that defeated the Loyola Marymount University Lions for the 2025 NCAA Beach Volleyball National Championship. At the Playa Azul Manzanillo stop, Navas and González won by besting Mexico in the semifinals (20–22, 21-19 and 15–13) and Canada in the final (21–15, 18-21 and 15–12). This was followed by another win at the Jalisco stop, defeating the United States (14–21, 21–18, 15–9) in the final. Navas & González closed the season by securing another stop, this one at Managua, by besting Mexico (21–15, 21–18) in the final. The duo closed their 2025 participation in the NORCECA tour by winning seven gold medals and a bronze medal, with their other wins being at the Guadalajara, Manzanillo, Zapopan, Tamaulipas, Honduras and Juan Dolio stops.

The program also fielded the youth duo of tzamar Arana & Yamila González, which qualified to the U18 FIVB Beach Volleyball Championships at the NORCEA qualifying tournament. The Caribbean Beach Volleyball Championships were held at Balneario de Carolina and continued regarded as the largest event of the sport in the Caribbean, fielding more than 230 teams both local and international in this edition. In July 2025, Complejo Los Tubos at Manatí reopened after completing rehabilitation following hurricane Maria, featuring areas specifically designed for beach volleyball. That month, the Balneario de Carolina hosted the Caribbean Beach Volleyball Championships, a youth tournament where 200 teams from the Americas and Europe competed. In September 2025, Puerto Rico classified to the Beach Volleyball World Championship in both branches when Navas & González and Encarnación & Rosich won the silver medal at the NORCECA qualifying tournament. The women's team also won the ninth NORCECA Tour stop in that town, defeating Costa Rica (24–22, 21–10) in the quarterfinals, Cuba in the semifinals (21–18, 17–21, 15–13) and the United States in the final (19–21, 21–17, 15–10).

The following month, Navas & González won the bronze at the Volleyball World Beach Pro Tour's Veracruz stop, defeating New Zealand (21–15, 21–17). They were selected for the honor serve an the men's NORCECA Final Six Ponce stop. González and Navas opened with losses to the two Germany pairs (21–17, 18–21, 9-15 and 21–17, 21–19), advanced with a win over Argentina (21–15, 21–17) but lost their next match to Olympic champion Brazil (22–24, 19–21). Returning to the NORCECA Tour, the duo won the Managua stop by defeating Mexico (21–15, 21–18). They closed the season with seven golds, a silver and a bronze.

The 2026 LAI beach volleyball season remained at Mayagüez, with Universidad Sagrado Corazón (USC) winning both categories. During the summer, Rauw Alejandro organized the Rauw Cup 2026. In May 2026, the 2026 DRD International Beach ProClassic was held at La Monserrate beach in Luquillo. Navas and González finished third in the NORCECA Tour opener at Juan Dolio, defeating Canada (21–14, 21–14). For Noche de San Juan, the municipality of Aguada organized a tournament at Balneario Pico de Piedra. The Caribbean Beach Volleyball Championships repeated at the Balneario de Carolina, with over 500 games being played.

Navas and González defended their regional championship at the 2026 Central American and Caribbean Games held at Santos Domingo, Dominican Republic, defeating Martinique (21-6 and 21–6) in their opening game but finished on the second place following a loss to Cuba (19–21, 21–16, 12–15). In the quarterfinals the duo defeated Venezuela (21–8, 21–13) and the Dominican Republic in the semifinals. In the final, Puerto Rico defeated Cuba (21–16, 18-21 and 18–16) to repeat the gold. On the men's side Daniel Rivera and William Figueroa defeated Honduras, Saint Kitts and Nevis (21-7 and 21–10) and Martinique by forgeit when it did not play. The duo defeated Venezuela (21–14, 21–12) in the quarterfinals, but lost their next match semifinal to Cuba (21–16, 21–14). In the medal round, Puerto Rico defeated Nicaragua to win the bronze medal. With this performance, all four volleyball modalities won medals for the program at the 2026 CACG.

== National teams ==
- Puerto Rico men's national beach volleyball team
- Puerto Rico women's national beach volleyball team
