= Cobia (disambiguation) =

Cobia, Rachycentron canadum, is a species of fish.

Cobia may also refer to:

== Places ==
- Cobia, Dâmbovița, a commune in Dâmbovița County, Romania
- Cobia (river), a tributary of the Potop in Dâmbovița County, Romania
- Cobia Island, one of the Ringgold Isles in Fiji

== Other uses ==
- USS Cobia, a submarine
