= Cobia Island =

Island in the Ringgold Isles, Fiji

Cobia
Native name: Thombia
- Location within Fiji

Geography
- Location: South Pacific Ocean
- Coordinates: 16.4622363°S 179.675957°W
- Archipelago: Ringgold Isles
- Area: 0.69 km^{2} (0.27 sq mi)

Administration
- Fiji
- Division: Eastern Division
- Province: Cakaudrove
- Tikina: Wainikeli

Demographics
- Population: 0

Additional information
- Time zone: UTC GMT +12

Cobia Island (also known as Thombia Island or Budd Island) is an island in Fiji, and is a member of the Ringgold Isles archipelago, which forms an outlier group to the northern island of Vanua Levu. It has a land area of 69.29 hectares. The island is shaped like a crescent moon.

Cobia Island is located within the Budd Reef and has a submerged volcanic crater with the highest elevation on the west side of the island. The geological formations and the beach forests of the island contribute to its natural significance as outlined in Fiji's Biodiversity and Action Plan.

The island is a popular snorkeling, kayaking and scuba diving location with a reported visibility under water of 120 feet or 36 meters.

== History ==
The island was considered a "conspicuous landmark" for navigators on ships sailing around and through the Fiji Islands. The island and its surrounding reef were described in Alexander Agassiz's publication, The Islands and Coral Reefs of Fiji (1899).

== See also ==
- Desert island
- List of islands
