= Wallyball =

Ball sport

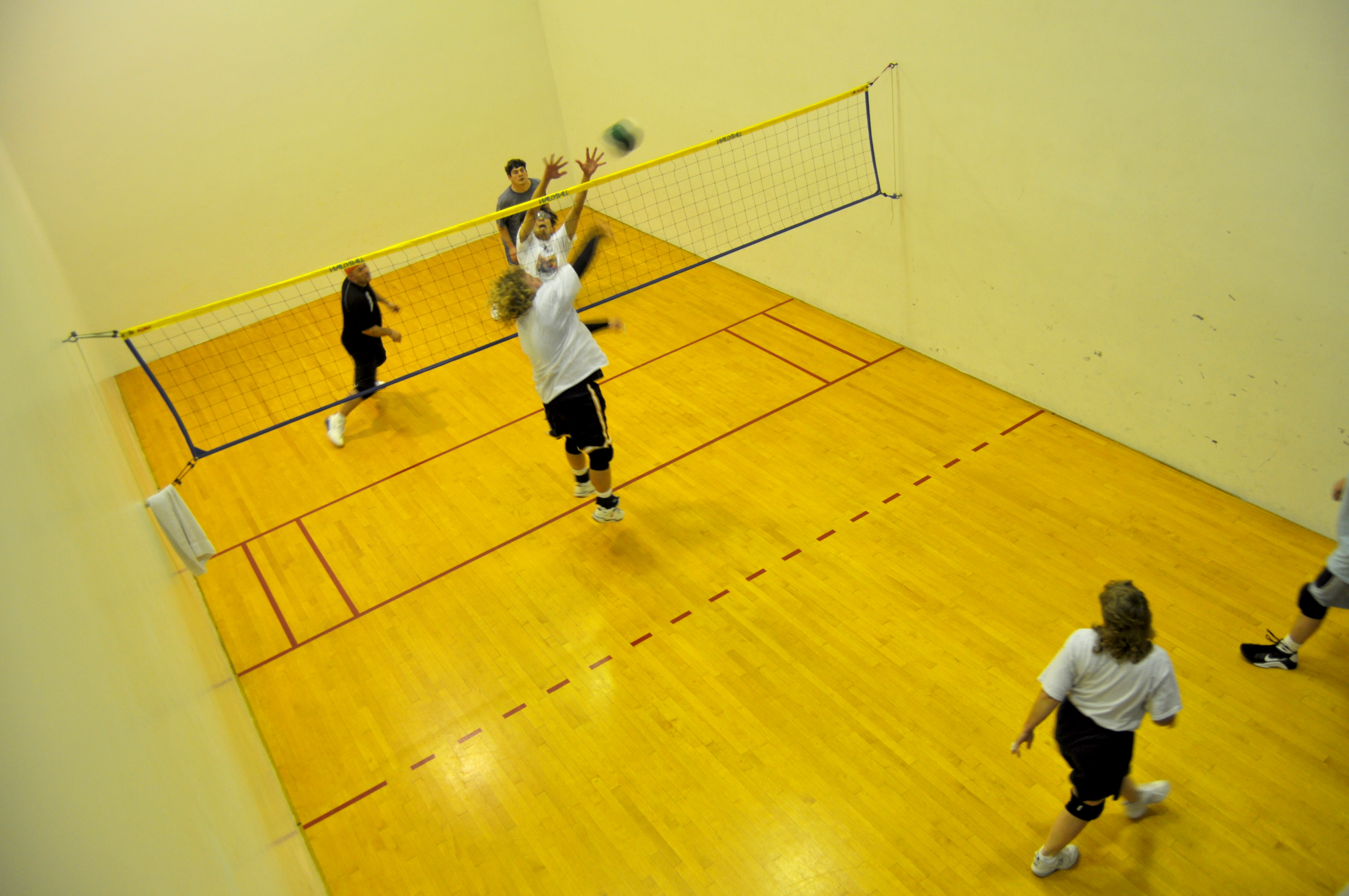
A game of wallyball, players at play ground.

Wallyball (known in some places as rebound volleyball) is a fast-paced sport that is similar to volleyball played in a racquetball court, where it is legal to hit the ball off of the walls.

The word "wallyball" is a portmanteau of the words "wall" and "volleyball".

== History ==
American Wallyball Association (AWA) was formed in 1979 and organizes US championship in Men and Women and coed (Mixed).

== Events ==
While in USA American Wallyball Association (AWA) organizes wallyball games, there are no international events for this competition.

== Number of players ==
The number of players on a side can vary from two to six. The American Wallyball Association allows two, three, or four player teams, while the Wallyball Information Network also allows five and six player teams.

== Court and equipment ==
Wallyball is played in a racquetball court which measures 40 feet (12 m) long, 20 feet (6 m) wide and 20 feet (6 m) high. A center line divides the court in half. The net is hung above the center line, traversing the entire width of the court. The net is 3 feet (0.91 m) tall and hung at no more than 8 feet (2.44 m) above the floor for men's wallyball games and no more than 7 feet 6 inches (2.29 m) above the floor for women. Two service areas are on each side, extending across the entire width of the court and 1 foot from each end wall. The ball is spherical, weighs between 9 and 10 ounces (255 and 283 g), and is 25 to 27 inches (64 to 69 cm) in circumference (the same size as a regular volleyball). The ball is made of rubber.

== Scoring ==
Wallyball can use two types of scoring. The first is called rally scoring (officially started being used in 1989). A point is scored on every service up to the point where one team reaches the "freeze point". Once that occurs, a point is awarded on the next side-out and from that point on, each team must serve to score a point. The "freeze point" varies depending on the number of points needed to win a game. The freeze point is three points fewer than the number of points needed to win a game. The side-out and unmodified rally scoring methods of volleyball are also commonly used. In wallyball this is called speed scoring.

Much of the strategy used in wallyball is similar to that used in volleyball. In the traditional three person game it is advantageous to employ one blocker, one person to defend against the dink (short, soft) shot, and the last person to defend shots over the other players' heads but still in bounds. On offense, the widely accepted strategy is of designating one player to receive all second hits to allow for the other players on their team to prepare for the third hit. In addition, varying the number of touches before the ball is hit over the net is crucial.

While some tactics in volleyball are effective in wallyball, there are several that are almost entirely unique to wallyball and highly counterintuitive to the average volleyball player. Ball handling in wallyball is more strict. Rotation on hand sets is watched closely and receiving the ball must be done cleanly. Steve Fuhrman, a National Wallyball Rules Director of over 20 years, explained that "Wallyball, Rebound Volleyball, and Volleyball are different games, with different rules", citing an example that "paintbrush" hit in wallyball is not allowed. In 2000, Fuhrman worked with US Volleyball to codify ball-handling guidelines for volleyball and wallyball, which only remain in place for wallyball today.

Players have been putting legal spin on serves, spikes, and placed hits in wallyball since the sport was invented. Legal spin is done by contacting the ball off-center as it is struck. The ball must pop off the players hand (not roll on it) to be a good, clean hit with spin.

== Out of bounds ==
During the serve the ball can hit one side wall on either side of the net. It cannot hit the back wall or two walls. The ball also cannot hit the ceiling when it crosses the net. The same is true during the volley. The ball can hit any number of walls, including the back wall and ceiling during the course of your three hits on your side. Once the ball is crossing the net though, it must comply with the one wall, no ceiling requirement, or it is considered out of bounds. If the players hit a wall on their side, the ball cannot hit another after going over the net, although there are many groups of players who choose to include a two wall and back wall hit as legal hits even after going over the net. While not part of the official rules, many feel it adds a chaotic and fun addition to the game.

Both The New Oxford American Dictionary (2001) and The American Heritage Dictionary of the English Language (4th ed. 2000) state, incorrectly, in their definitions of "wallyball", that the ball may contact the ceiling before crossing the net.

== Time-outs ==
Two timeouts of 30 seconds each are allowed. If more than the allowed timeouts are called, a penalty is given. Penalties can be a single point, game forfeiture, or a game suspension of the captain.

== Serving ==
The player in the back position of the court puts the ball in play by hitting it with one hand only or any part of his or her arm. A jump serve is permitted. For the serve to be good, it must pass over the net without touching the net or any other players on the server's team. In addition, the ball may not touch two or more walls before being played, the opponent's back wall, or the ceiling of the court. Should the server catch the ball on service toss, a sideout will be called. No members of the serving team may attempt to block the opponent's view of the server in any way. A team must maintain their serving order throughout the match. If the players are discovered out of order, the game stops immediately, any points scored while the server was in an illegal position are canceled, and a side-out is declared.
