= Alfonso Valdés Cobián =

Puerto Rican industrialist, banker, sportsman and politician

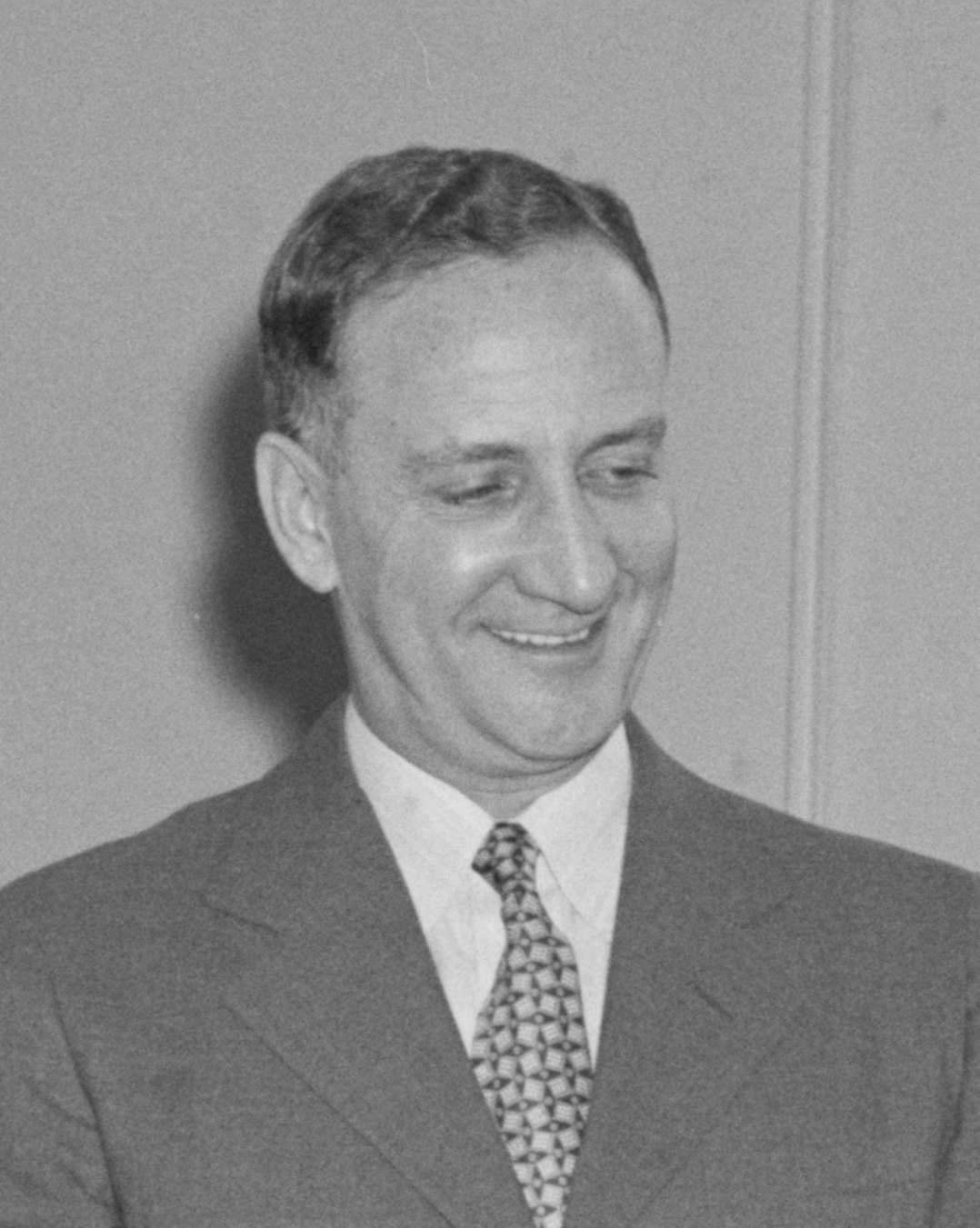

Member of the Puerto Rico Senate from the Mayagüez district
- In office 1928–1936

Member of the Puerto Rico House of Representatives from the 16th District
- In office 1917–1920

Personal details
- Born: June 23, 1890 Bayamón, Puerto Rico
- Died: February 14, 1988 (aged 97) San Juan, Puerto Rico
- Party: Alianza Puertorriqueña
- Other political affiliations: Republican
- Spouse: Grace García
- Children: Grace Marie, Encarnita Quinlan and Alfonso Jr.
- Education: Columbia University (BEng)
- Occupation: industrialist, banker, sportsman and politician
- Valdés Cobián was the cofounder of Cervecería India, Inc., currently Puerto Rico's largest beer brewery. He served as Senator in the Puerto Rican Senate. He was also the owner of the "Indios de Mayagüez" (Mayagüez Indians), a basketball team.

Alfonso Valdés Cobián (June 23, 1890 – February 14, 1988), was an industrialist, banker, sportsman and politician. Valdés Cobián was a cofounder of Cervecería India, Inc., currently Puerto Rico's largest beer brewery.

== Early years ==
Valdés Cobián was born in Bayamon, Puerto Rico to Ramon and Encarnación Cobián. When he was a child his family moved to the United States and lived in Manhattan. While living there he attended the Hamilton institute, a preparatory school, and Columbia University, where he received a degree in electrical engineering in 1911.

The family returned to Puerto Rico and in 1910, his father, Ramón Valdés founded and organized the "Mayaguez Light, Power and Ice Company", a utility in the city of Mayagüez. The elder Valdés named Alfonso the company's vice president in 1915. The Government took over all power generation in the late 1930s and the company is now operated by "La Autoridad de Energía Eléctrica de Puerto Rico" (The Puerto Rico Electric Energy Authority).

== Cervecería India ==
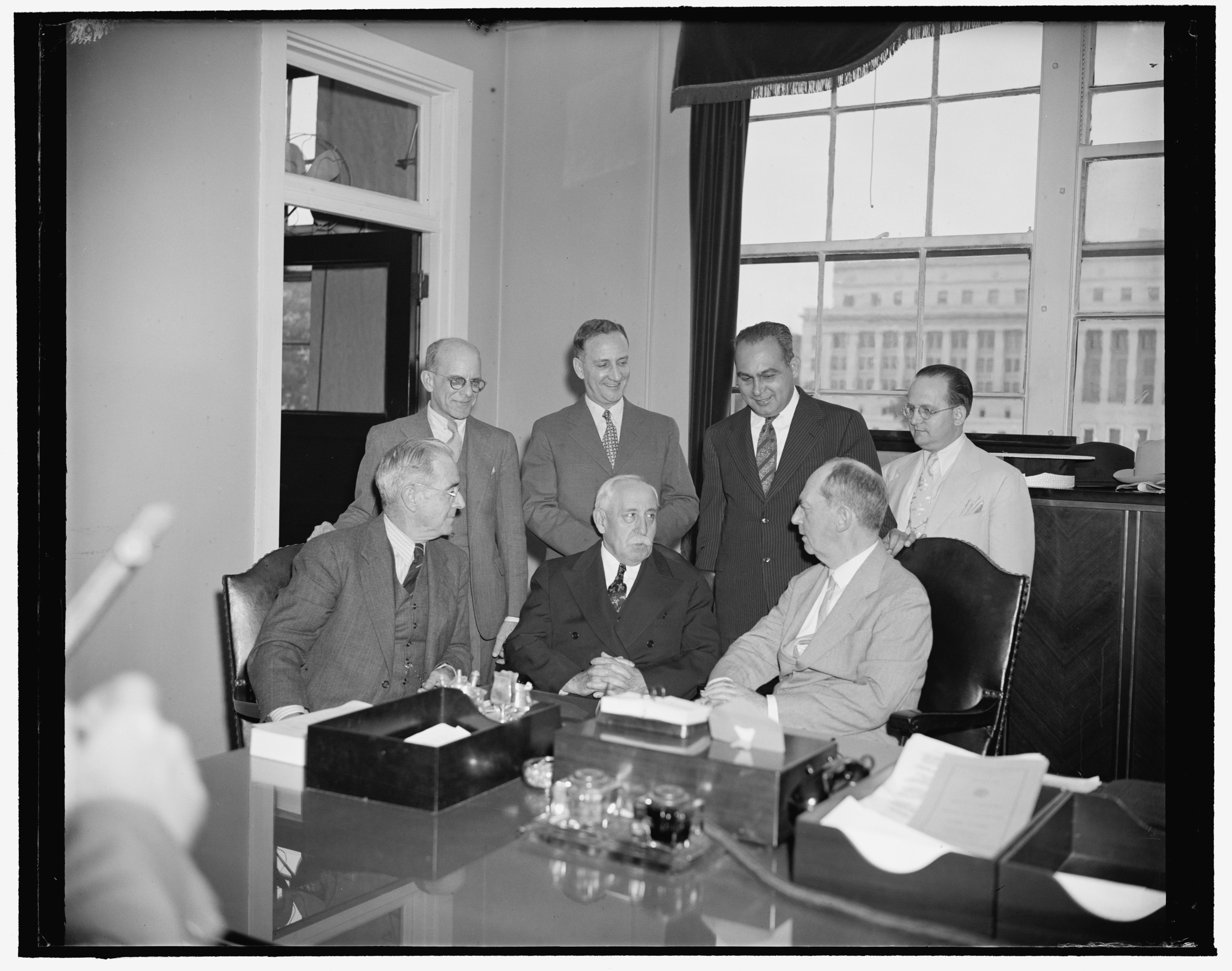
Admiral Leahy confers with (left to right) Martínez Nadal, President of the Puerto Rican Senate, Santiago Iglesias, Resident Commissioner standing; Fernando Geigel, City Manager of San Juan, P.R., Alfonso Valdez, Puerto Rican Senator, Bolívar Pagan, Vice President of the Puerto Rican Senate, and Luis Obergh, counsel for Nadal

Mayagüez is known as "La Ciudad de las Aguas Puras" (The City of the Pure Waters) because of the quality of its waters. The nickname originated because of the quality of the waters from the Yagüez River. The word "Yagüez" is Taino for "Place of pure and clear waters" . Valdés Cobián's brother Sabino, took a sample of the waters of Mayagüez to the Wallestein Laboratory in New York which confirmed the quality of the waters for the elaboration of beer.

Valdés Cobián and his brothers, Sabino and Ramón decided to build a brewery in Mayagüez and on November 2, 1937, they founded the Compañía Cervecera de Puerto Rico which was later renamed Cervecería India. The company competed with two other native beer breweries, "Real" and "Corona". Corona would later be launched in Mexico. Valdés Cobián, as chairman and president, successfully led his company converting it into Puerto Rico's largest beer brewery and manufacture of canned and bottled soft drinks.

Besides his chairmanship of Cervecería India, Valdés Cobián held the Orange Crush soft-drink franchise and was president of the Ana Maria Sugar Company and the Insular Feed Mill. For 25 years he was the major stockholder and board chairman of the Banco Credito y Ahorro Ponceno, which at the time was the second largest bank in Puerto Rico.

== Team owner ==
Valdés Cobián was a founder of the Puerto Rican winter baseball league and owned the Indios de Mayagüez (Mayagüez Indians), the most successful team in the history of the Puerto Rican League. The team was founded in 1938, and once the Puerto Rican Professional Baseball League (LBPPR in Spanish) was created, the Mayagüez team became a part of it. A management team led by Valdés Cobián owned the team during its initial years.

== Politician ==
Valdés Cobián was elected in 1917 to the Puerto Rico House of Representatives representing the district of Mayagüez, position in which he served until 1928. In 1928 he won his first of three terms as a member of the Senate of Puerto Rico, and also became president of the Puerto Rican Republican Party.

== Later years ==
In 1960 he was president of the Puerto Rico Manufacturers Association. Valdés Cobián lived in Villa Caparra, a San Juan suburb. On February 8, 1988, Valdés Cobián died in San Juan, Puerto Rico, after suffering a heart attack two days earlier, at the age of 97. Valdés Cobián was buried in Bayamón's Porta Coeli Cemetery. He was survived by his wife, Grace García, whom he married on August 14, 1939, two daughters, Grace Marie, Encarnita Quinlan and a son, Alfonso Jr., and five grandchildren. After his death, his wife became the president of brewery until her retirement in 2002, when her granddaughter, Camalia Valdés assumed the presidency of the company.

== Legacy ==
The City of Mayagüez honored his memory by naming the street where the Cervecería India is located to Avenida Alfonso Valdés Cobián.

== See also ==
- Cervecería India
- Indios de Mayagüez
- List of Puerto Ricans
