= Compañía Cervecera de Puerto Rico =

Brewery in Puerto Rico

Coordinates: 18°12′24.24″N 67°08′29.33″W

- Industry: Alcoholic beverage
- Founded: 1937
- Founder: Alfonso, Sabino and Ramón Valdés Cobián
- Headquarters: Mayagüez, Puerto Rico
- Key people: Grace Marie Valdés
- Products: Beer, Malta and Sodas
- Website: www.cerveceradepr.com

Compañía Cervecera de Puerto Rico (formerly known as Cervecería India) is a large brewery in Puerto Rico. It is located in Mayagüez, Puerto Rico. The company's main brand is Medalla Light.

== History ==
The company was founded on November 2, 1937, by the brothers Valdés Cobián: Alfonso, Sabino and Ramón Valdés Cobián, in Mayagüez, the largest city on the west coast of Puerto Rico. The Valdés brothers were following the example of their father, Don Ramon Valdés, who had founded the Mayagüez Light, Power and Ice Company in 1910. In 1938, their first beer, Cerveza India, was released to the public. The company competed with two other native beer breweries, "Real" and "Cerveceria Corona" (Cerveceria Corona de Puerto Rico "subsequently sold its trademark rights to Cervecería Modelo de México, which then launched Cerveza Corona as Modelo's Corona Extra)." Alfonso, as chairman and president, successfully led his company converting it into Puerto Rico's largest beer brewery and manufacturer of canned and bottled soft drinks.

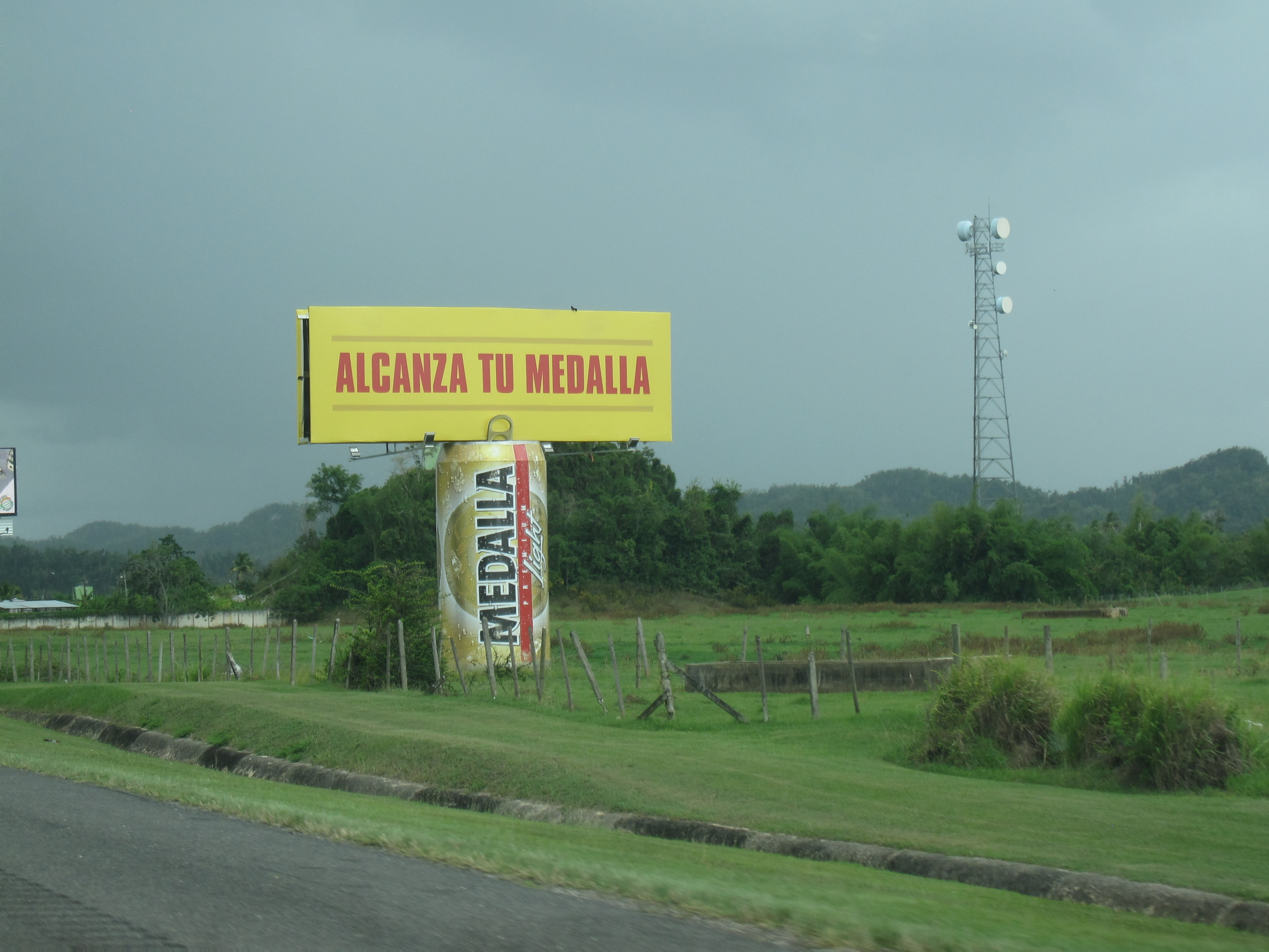
Medalla beer advertisement on PR-129 northbound.

In the late '70s, the brewery was forced to expand its portfolio and produce a lighter beer with less calories than their Cerveza India. Until that time, India was the only alcoholic beverage producing plant in Mayagüez.

In 1985, their main competition, Corona, went bankrupt and left a free way to Cervecería India, which was in full swing after the release of its new product Medalla Light years before. In October 2009, the brewery reverted its name to "Compañía Cervecera de Puerto Rico".

From 2002 to 2017, Camalia Valdés served as president and CEO of the company. In 2017, Grace Marie Valdés succeeded Camalia as president and CEO.

The company works to promote the art and culture of Puerto Rico. It soon later launched an artisanal brewery, Del Oeste Brewery within its main brewing facility.

In 2018, the company announced a distribution agreement to expand the Medalla Light brand into the United States, specifically Florida.

As of March 13, 2023, Medalla Light had expanded into 18 US states with the announcement of entering the Ohio and North Carolina markets. (CT, DC, FL, GA, IL, MA, MD, NC, NH, NJ, NY, OH, PA, RI, TN, VA, WI)

== Products ==
The company's main product is Medalla Light, a 4.2% abv pale lager. The brewery also produces Malta India, a non-alcoholic soft drink made from barley. In 1940, it began producing Orange Crush and Old Colony sodas. In May 2010, the brewery announced the launch of their new beer, Silver Key Light, which hit the market on June 1, 2010. They launched Magna, a premium beer, on August 1, 2011. On November 5, 2019, Cerveza India, which was their first beer, was relaunched as a limited edition.

=== Beers ===
- Medalla Light - Pale Lager with 4.2% abv. Created in 1980.
- Medalla Ultra Light - Pale Lager with 4.0% abv.
- Silver Key Light - Light beer with 3.5% abv. Created in May 2010.
- Magna Special Craft - Premium Lager with 5.1% abv. Released on August 1, 2011.
- Del Oeste - Artisanal craft beer.

=== Maltas ===
- Malta India

=== Soft Drinks ===
- Orange Crush
- Old Colony Sodas

== Gallery ==
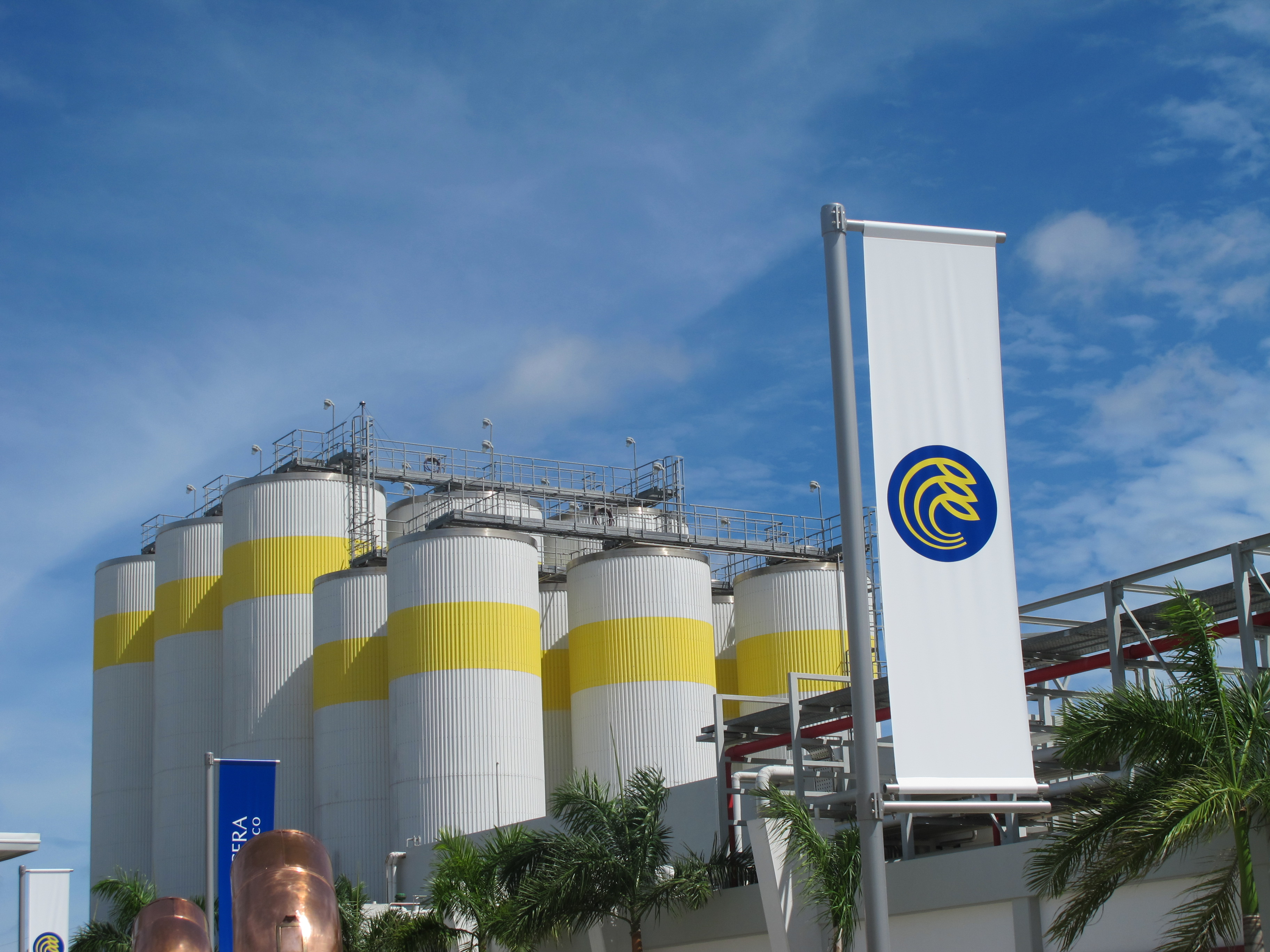
Cervecera de Puerto Rico brewery

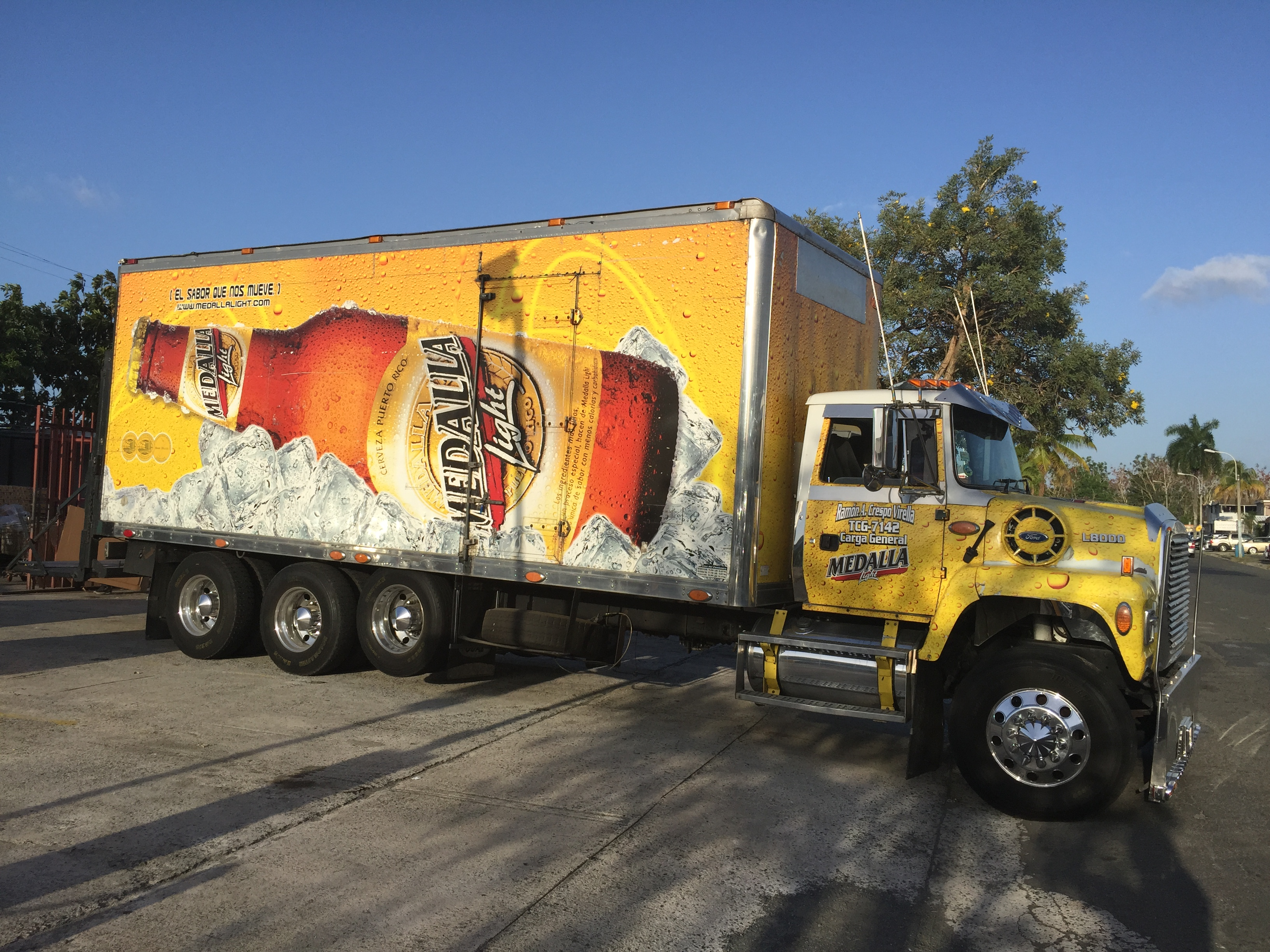
Medalla delivery truck

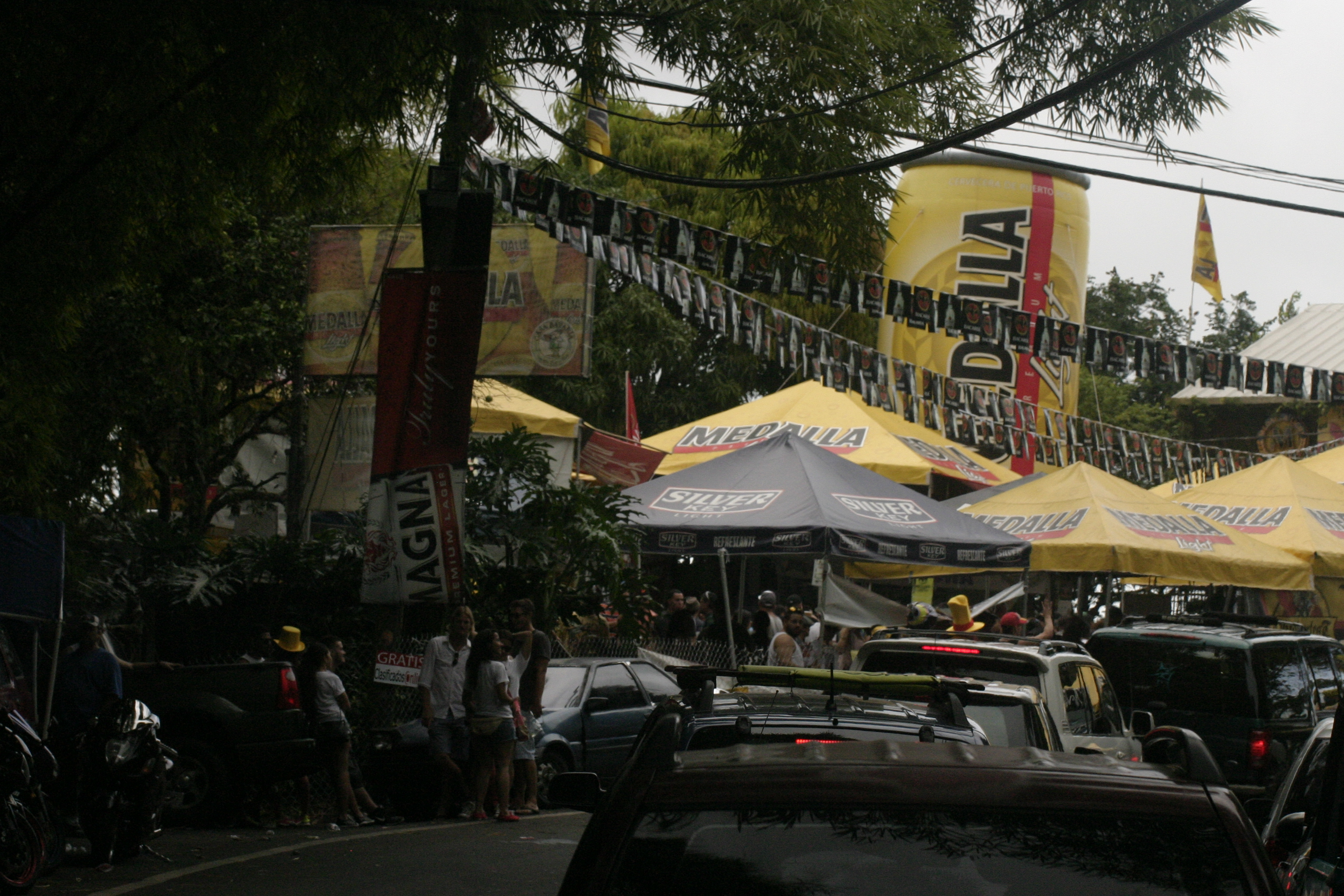
Street party and Medalla Beer umbrellas

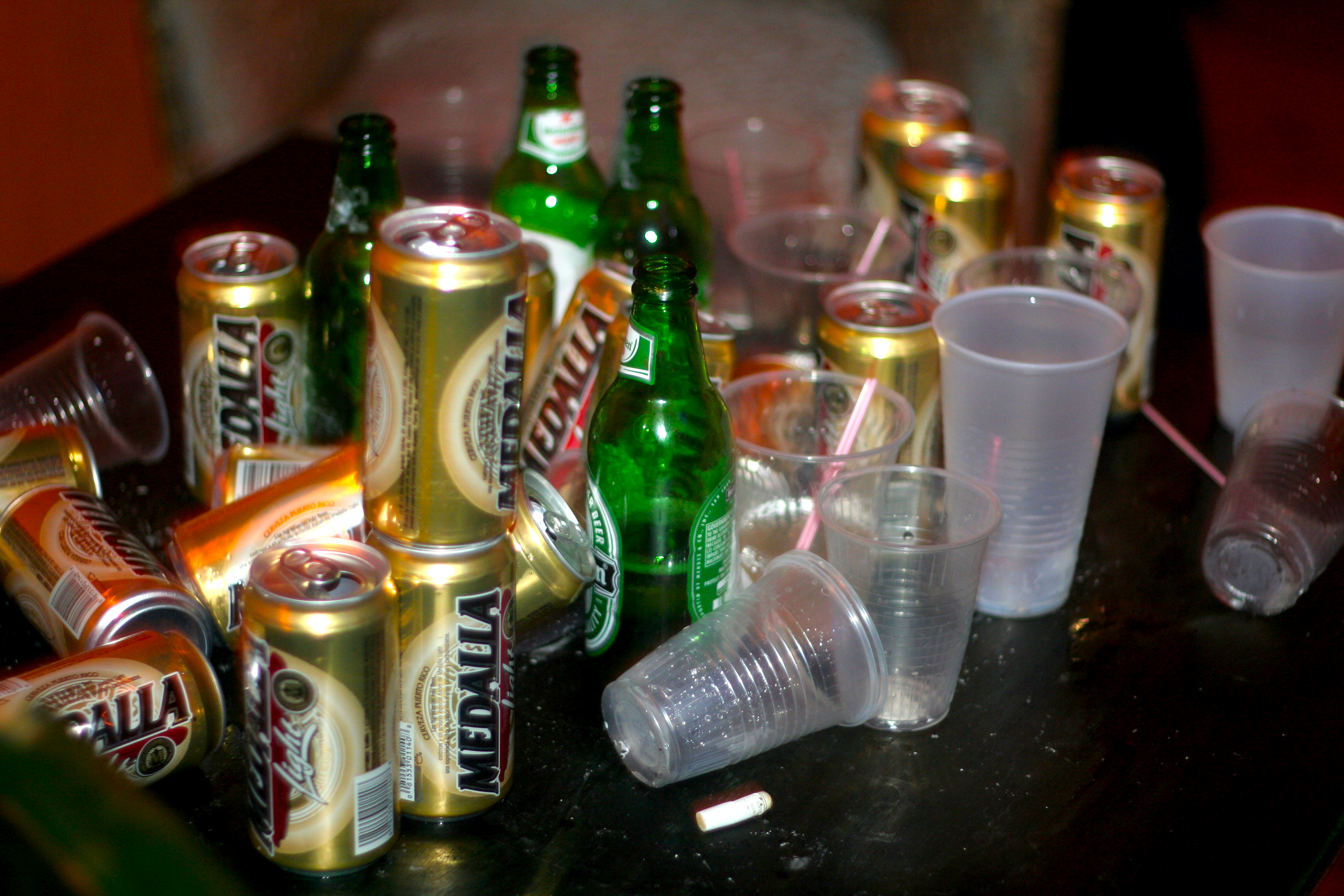
Medalla beer cans

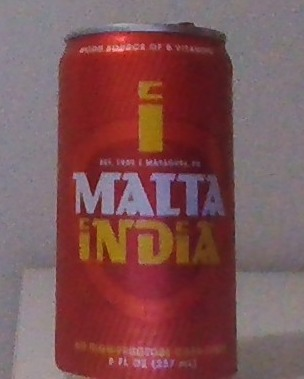
Malta India canned version
