= Ramón Valdés Cobián =

Puerto Rican politician (1886–1962)

Member of the Puerto Rico Senate from the San Juan district
- In office 1917–1920

Personal details
- Born: January 8, 1886 Bayamón, Puerto Rico
- Died: October 15, 1962 (aged 76) Santurce, Puerto Rico
- Party: Union of Puerto Rico
- Education: Fordham University (BEng)
- Profession: Politician, Entrepreneur

Ramón Valdés Cobián was a Puerto Rican businessman, entrepreneur and politician. He served as a member of the Senate of Puerto Rico from 1917 to 1920.

Valdés Cobián was born in Bayamon, Puerto Rico to Ramon and Encarnación Cobián. When he was a child his family moved to the United States and lived in Manhattan. Earned a Bachelor degree in electrical engineering from Fordham University. The family returned to Puerto Rico and in 1910, his father, Ramón Valdés founded and organized the Mayaguez Light, Power and Ice Company, a utility company in the city of Mayagüez.

In 1917, Valdés Cobián was elected to the first Senate of Puerto Rico, representing the District of San Juan. He served in that position until 1920.

After that, Valdés Cobián and his brothers, Sabino and Alfonso decided to build a brewery in Mayagüez and on November 2, 1937, they founded the Compañía Cervecera de Puerto Rico which was later renamed Cervecería India. The company became Puerto Rico's largest beer brewery and manufacture of canned and bottled soft drinks.

He died on October 15, 1962 in Santurce, Puerto Rico at age 76 and was buried at the Puerto Rico Memorial Cemetery in Carolina, Puerto Rico.
