= Rosa Elena Egipciaco =

Puerto Rican mundillo maker

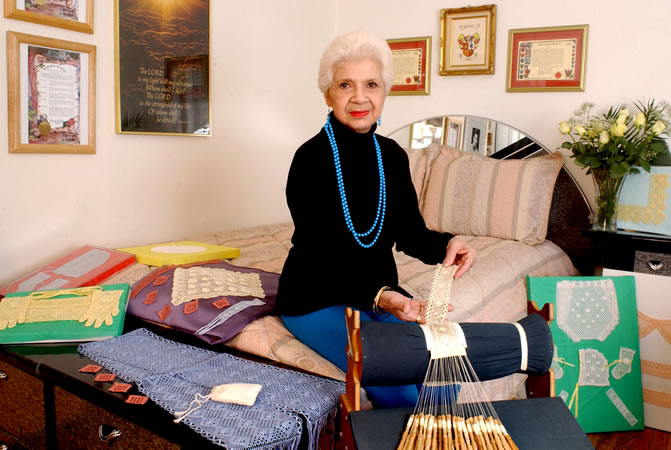
Egipciaco in 2003

Rosa Elena Egipciaco (May 15, 1920 – 2023), often referred to as the "Queen of Mundillo", was a master Mundillo lacemaker and teacher of the Puerto Rican folk art. In addition to being part of the long Mundillo tradition of her hometown of Moca, Puerto Rico, she belongs to the much larger, much longer tradition of Spanish and European bobbin lacemaking.

== Biography ==
Egipciaco was born into a family tradition of lace-making, as her mother and grandmother were noted makers of lace. She recalls starting to learn mundillo when she was four years old. After graduating from the University of Puerto Rico, Río Piedras Campus, she continued to practice mundillo and co-founded the Cultural Center of Moca. Egipciaco moved to New York in 1986 and began to teach lace-making through a variety of programs ranging from workshops for the International Ladies Garment Workers Union to serving as a master in the New York State Council on the Arts Folk Arts Apprenticeship Program. Egipciaco died in 2023.

== Work ==
Her work has been exhibited at New York University, Columbia University, the American Museum of Natural History, Casita Maria, El Museo del Barrio, Marymount College, Brentwood International Ladies Garment Union, the Office of the Commonwealth of Puerto Rico, and La Casa de la Herencia Cultural Puertorriqueña.

== Awards ==
In 2003, Egipciaco was named as one of eleven artists to receive a National Heritage Fellowship from the National Endowment for the Arts. The fellowships are the country's highest honor in the folk and traditional arts. The awardees each received a one-time award of $20,000.
