= Marias =

Marias or Marías may refer to:

== Places ==
- Islas Marías, a Mexican archipelago
- Marías District, in Dos de Mayo province, Peru
- Marias River, a tributary of the Missouri River
- Marías, Aguada, Puerto Rico, a barrio
- Marías, Añasco, Puerto Rico, a barrio
- Marías, Moca, Puerto Rico, a barrio

== People ==
- Javier Marías, Spanish author, born 1951
- Notis Marias, Greek political scientist and politician, born 1957

== Other ==
- Mariáš (card game), a trick-taking card game
- The Marías, an indie psychedelic rock/soul band
- Alternate name for María biscuits

== See also ==
- es:Marías, a disambiguation page in Spanish Wikipedia
