= Enrique Laguerre =

Puerto Rican writer

- Born: Enrique Arturo Laguerre Vélez; July 15, 1905; Aceitunas, Moca, Puerto Rico
- Died: June 16, 2005 (aged 99); Carolina, Puerto Rico
- Occupations: Writer; poet; critic; teacher
- Spouse: Luz V. Romero Garcia
- Writing career
- Pen name: Tristan Ronda; Luis Urayoan; Motial; Alberto Prado
- Genres: novels, plays, columns
- Notable work: "La Llamarada"

Enrique Arturo Laguerre Vélez (July 15, 1905 – June 16, 2005) was a teacher, novelist, playwright, critic, and newspaper columnist from Moca, Puerto Rico. He is the author of the 1935 novel La Llamarada (lit. 'The blaze'), which has been for many years obligatory reading in many literature courses in Puerto Rico.

== Biography ==
Laguerre studied at various universities, obtaining degrees in arts from the University of Puerto Rico and Columbia University.

In 1924, he took courses on teaching in rural areas in the town of Aguadilla. The courses were taught by Carmen Gómez Tejera. After this, he taught from 1925 to 1988, both at the elementary school and university levels.

Laguerre was known to use the pen-names of Tristán Ronda, Luis Urayoán, Motial and Alberto Prado, among others. Married for many years to the well-respected writer Luz V. Romero García, he also worked in many Puerto Rican publications before joining the staff of El Vocero.

Laguerre was mentored by Antonio S. Pedreira. He published La llamarada in 1935, which featured the narrative style characteristic of American works, in reflection of his universalist philosophy. A second edition, with a prologue written by Pedreira, was published in 1939.

On June 8, 1954, Laguerre was part of the Institute of Puerto Rican Culture’s (ICP) Board of Directors, remaining a member for several years. On March 23, 1973, Laguerre was once again voted into the ICP board, becoming its president in August of that year.

In 1976, Laguerre served as one of the founders of the Center for Advanced Studies on Puerto Rico and the Caribbean (CEAPRC) at San Juan, later being recognized as an emertitus member.

In 1998, his peers as well as former governors Rafael Hernández Colón and Luis A. Ferré, advocated for Laguerre to be considered for the Nobel Prize in Literature. Despite their efforts, Laguerre was not awarded the prestigious award.

Laguerre was a prolific writer throughout his life and due to this, Obras Completas, which gathered three tomes worth of content, only features a small portion part of his work.

The 1990s were a rough period in Laguerre's life, with several family members dying. These included his sister Petra in February 1997, his sister Asunción in December 1994 and his brother Ángel In June 1996. He still made some public appearances such as one in May 1996, where he received homage at PUCPR. The 1996 telephone book featured Laguerre along D. German Riefkohl and Isolina Ferré. In 1998, the Palacete de los Monreau from La Llamarada was featured.

Enrique Laguerre died on June 16, 2005, at the age of 99. His body was buried on the grounds of the Palacete Los Moreau, an old hacienda restored as a museum, in his native town of Moca.

== Writings ==
Laguerre was one of the most prolific novelists of Puerto Rico and was nominated for a Nobel Prize in Literature. Following in the steps of Manuel Zeno Gandía, Laguerre's most influential work focused on the problems of the colonized society. His novel La Llamarada offers a comprehensive view of rural Puerto Rico during the Great Depression. Most of his novels are essential readings in Puerto Rican literature courses. Laguerre wrote more than 200 articles and essays on art and culture, more than 45 about shows, at least 70 about voyages, more than 200 about education, more than 40 about history and anthropology, at least 139 on language and literature, more than 75 on nature and ecology, nearly 200 on individuals, at least 150 on urban planning, more than 170 on politics and economy, more than 450 on sociology, more than 45 on recent events, at least 20 stories, 15 novels, at least 14 poems, at least 3 on theater, nearly a dozen letters, more than a 100 on literary criticism, He was also a guest in the work of other writers, collaborating in eight books and redacting at least 15 prologues. Laguerre personally wrote five anthologies, but his work was included in more than twenty.

Several of his works were translated into English including The Labyrinth, Patchouli, The Enemy, The Cockfight, The Strike and The Benevolent Masters. Laguerre also published five articles and letters in English.

== Works ==
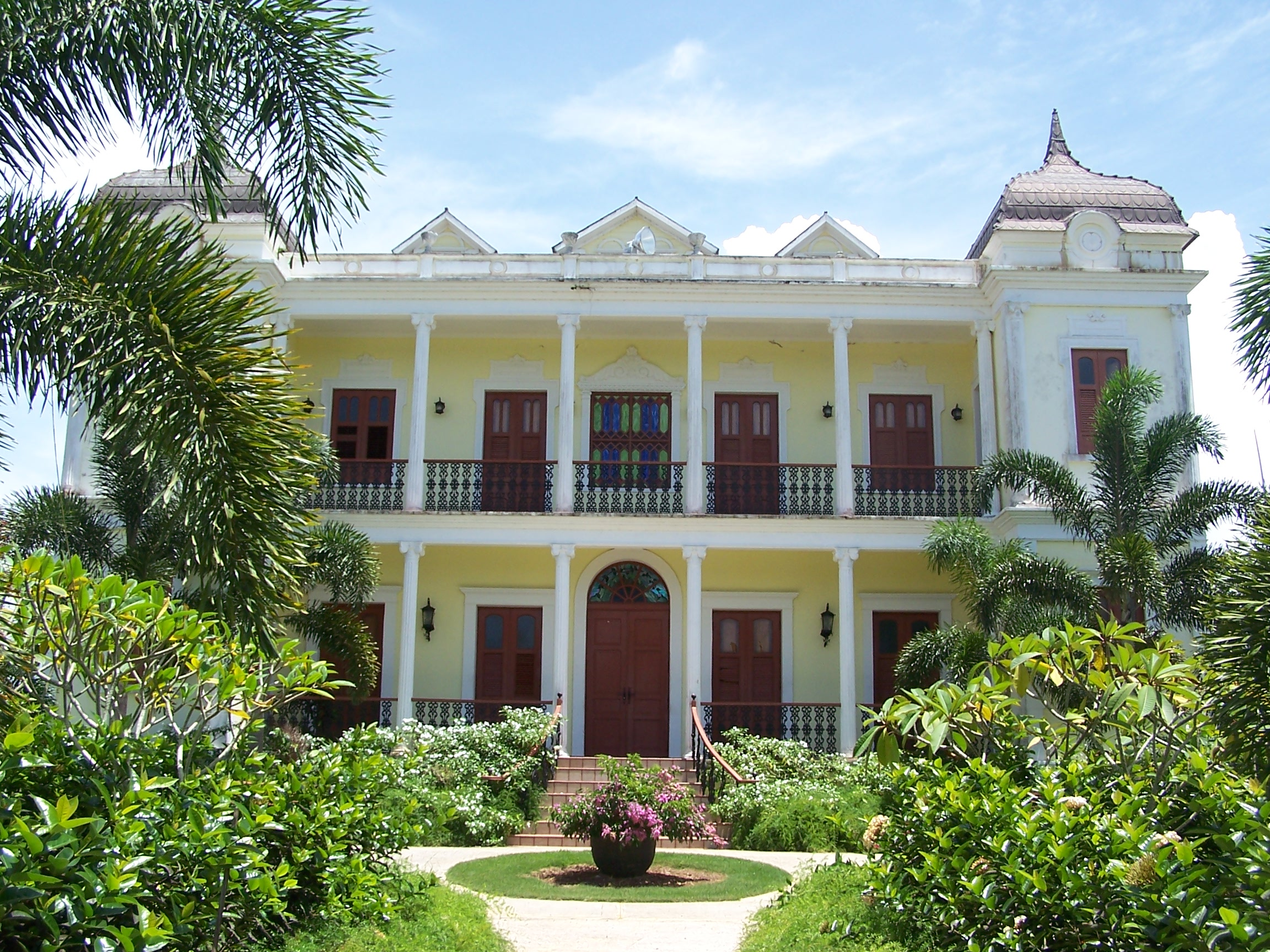
The Labadie Mansion inspired Enrique Laguerre to write La Llamarada. The property was restored as a museum and renamed the "Palacete Los Moreau", in honor of Laguerre's fictional characters.

Literary Works – Novels

- La Llamarada (1935)
- Solar Montoya (1941)
- El 30 de Febrero (1942)
- La Resaca (1949)
- Los Dedos de la Mano (1950)
- La Ceiba en el Tiesto (1956)
- El Laberinto (1959)
- El Laberinto in English The Labyrinth(1960)
- Cauce sin Río: Diario de mi Generación (1962)
- El Fuego y su Aire (1970)
- Los Amos Benévolos (1976)
- Los Amos Benévolos in English The Benevolent Masters (1986)
- Infiernos Privados (1986)
- Por Boca de Caracoles (1990)
- Los Gemelos (1992)
- Proa Libre Sobre Mar Gruesa (1995)
- Contrapunto de Soledades (1999)

Ensayos y Teatro

- La Resentida (1949)
- Antología de Cuentos Puertorriqueños (1954)
- Pulso de Puerto Rico (1956)
- Enrique Laguerre Habla Sobre Nuestras Bibliotecas (1959)
- Obras Completas (1962)
- La Responsabilidad de un Profesor Universitario (1963)
- El Jíbaro de Puerto Rico: Símbolo y Figura (1968)
- La Poesía Modernista en Puerto Rico (1969)
- Polos de la Cultura Iberoamericana (1977)

== Awards ==
Laguerre received dozens of awards and recognitios for his work. On August 10, 1939, he was named an honorary member of the Argentine Cultural Committee. On June 10, 1959, Laguerre was named a member of the American Cultural Union. On April 27, 1963, Laguerre received a certificate of merit for his work at Isabela. On January 30, 1969, Laguerre received an honoris causa degree from the Pontifical Catholic University of Puerto Rico. On June 12, 1970, Laguerre was named emeritus professor of the University of Puerto Rico. During the summer of 1970, Laguerre received the Puertorriqueñidad Award at Fordham University. On September 22, 1973, Laguerre received a diploma of "solidarity and recognition" from Centro Cultural José de Diego at Aguadilla. On June 26, 1994, Laguerre received an honoris causa degree from the CEAPRC. On June 16, 1974, Laguerre received an honoris causa degree from the University of Puerto Rico. On June 24, 1996, Laguerre received an honoris causa degree from the Metropolitan University of Puerto Rico. In July 1999, Laguerre received an honoris causa degree from Caribbean University.

On February 14, 1971, the Instituto de Puerto Rico en Nueva York granted him its Literary Award. In 1975, Laguerre received the Medalla Nacional de la Cultura from the ICP. Laguerre was nominated for the Juan Rulfo Award of Hispano-American Literature and was recognized by the Instituto de Literatura Puertorriqueña on several occasions. On November 19, 1975, Laguerre received the Literature Award from the ICP. In 1980, Laguerre received the Mobil Award. In October 1983, Laguerre received the first Alejandro Tapia y Rivera Medal for La resentida. On October 6, 1983, Laguerre received a plaque from the Colegio de Tecnólogos Médicos de Puerto Rico. In December 1983, the 4th Festival del Mundillo y 3ra Fiesta de Bella's Artes was dedicated to Laguerre. In April 1984, the Universidad Interamericana de Puerto Rico dedicate the Fiesta de la Lengua to Laguerre. On May 3, 1985, the Universidad Metropolitana's Bilingual Education Projects homaged Laguerre. On February 19, 1997, Laguerre received the Premio General Fernando Chardón from the Asociación de Educación Privada de Puerto Rico.

=== Homages ===
On April 27, 1963, Laguerre received an homage from the Club Isabelino. On September 22, 1973, Laguerre was hosted as an honor guest of Aguadilla. On February 28, 1974, he was the guest speaker of the Club Rotario at La Romana. In April 1982, the Colegio Universitario del Turabo dedicated the Semana de la Legua to Laguerre. In January 1984, Laguerre received homage from the municipality of Isabela following the 25th edition of La Llamarada. From February to March 1985, the Colegio Universitario Metropolitano homages him. In 1985, the Universidad del Turabo held an homage to Laguerre.

On January 29, 1994, Grupo de Avanzada Cultural homages him with a portrait. In April 1996, the UPR homages him as part of the Semana de la Lengua. On April 26, 1996, his literary work was recognized by COSVI. On May 24, 1996, Laguerre was homages during the VIII Olimpiadas del Español held at the Catholic University of Puerto Rico. In March 1999, Laguerre received an homage at Arecibo. In April 1999, an exposition on Neruda held at Bayamón was dedicated to Laguerre. In April 1999, local agro homages Laguerre. In April 1999, the municipality of Caguas homaged him. In May 1999, the Puerto Rico House of Representatives homaged Laguerre. In July 1999, the ICP dedicated its first Festival to Laguerre. In August 1999, Laguerre received an homage at the Centro de Bella's Artes. On July 15, 2000, Laguerre received a painting from the Club de Cultura de Lajas. In September 2000, the ICP dedicated an issue of its periodical to homage Laguerre. In November 2001, the CEAPRC homaged Laguerre.

== Reception ==
=== Public and media ===
Laguerre, his work and actions were the subject of nearly four hundred news pieces. In December 1985, Laguerre was the topic of an episode in WIPR's El escritor y su mundo series.

=== Critics ===
Laguerre's work has been widely researched and criticized, leading to more than 400 pieces. More than 75 letters were addressed to him, his merits or his work. On June 29, 1932, El hombre que se malogró received an honorable mention at the Ateneo Puertorriqueño's short novel awards. On October 12, 1933, El hombre caído received an honorable mention at the Ateneo's tale awards. On October 21, 1935, La Llamarada received the Instituto de Literatura de Puerto Rico's Award. On October 21, 1941, Solar Montoya received the ILPR's Award. In 1944, Laguerre received the La Torre Award from the staff of the UPR magazine of the same name.

On October 21, 1949, La resaca received the ILPR's Award. Laguerre repeated the Award the following year. On October 21, 1951, Los dedos de la mano earned the ILPR's Award. In 1964, Laguerre's Hojas Libres received a journalistic award from the ILPR.

== See also ==
- List of Puerto Ricans
- French immigration to Puerto Rico
- List of Puerto Rican writers
- Puerto Rican literature
