= Rocha, Moca, Puerto Rico =

Barrio of Puerto Rico

Rocha
- Barrio
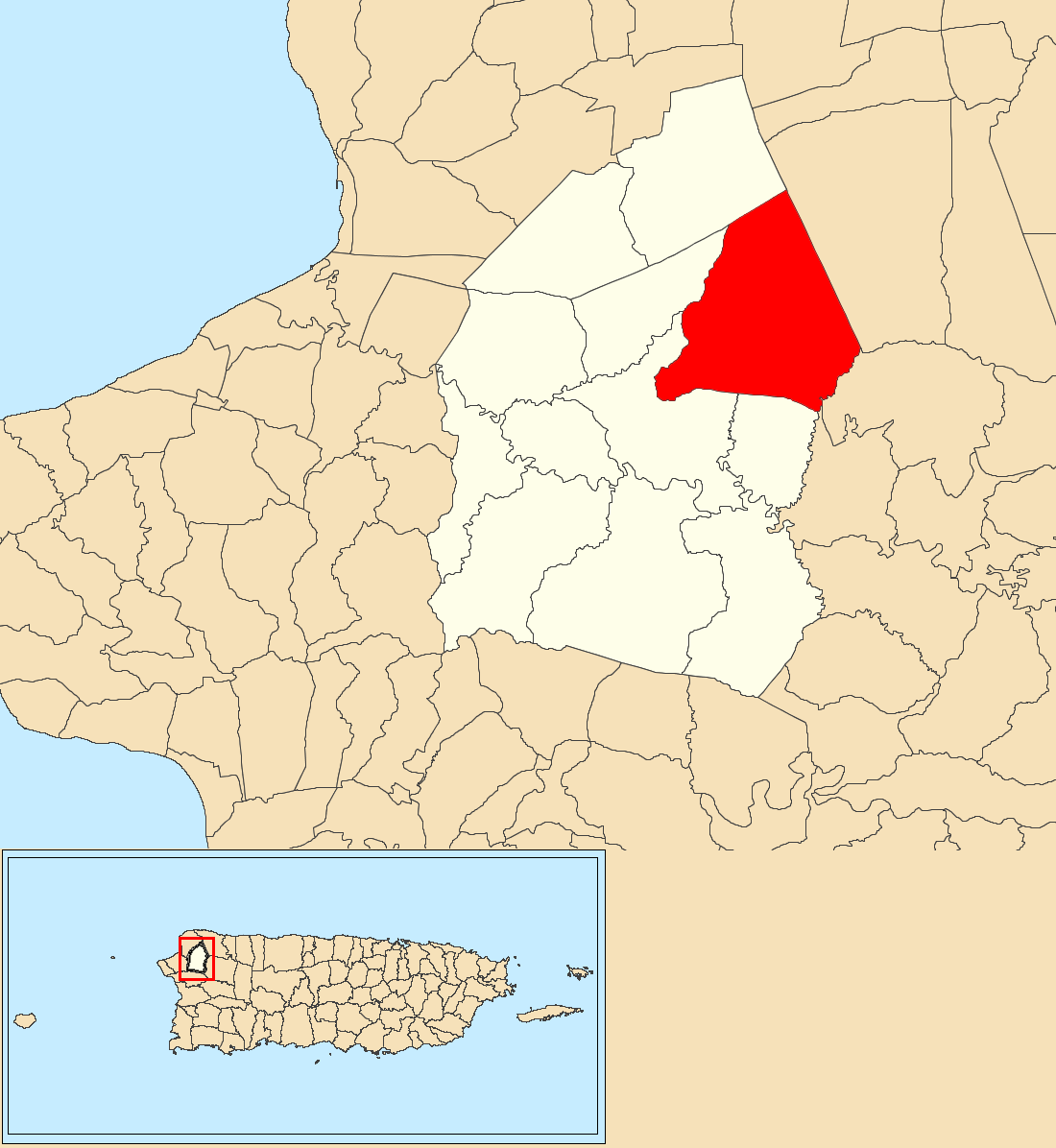
- Location of Rocha within the municipality of Moca shown in red

- Location of Puerto Rico
- Coordinates: 18°24′03″N 67°03′03″W
- Commonwealth: Puerto Rico
- Municipality: Moca

Area
  - Total: 7.13 sq mi (18.5 km^{2})
  - Land: 7.13 sq mi (18.5 km^{2})
  - Water: 0 sq mi (0 km^{2})
- Elevation: 873 ft (266 m)

Population (2010)
  - Total: 4,004
  - Density: 561.6/sq mi (216.8/km^{2})
- Source: 2010 Census
- Time zone: UTC−4 (AST)

Rocha is a barrio in the municipality of Moca, Puerto Rico. Its population in 2010 was 4,004.

== History ==
Rocha was in Spain's gazetteers until Puerto Rico was ceded by Spain in the aftermath of the Spanish–American War under the terms of the Treaty of Paris of 1898 and became an unincorporated territory of the United States. In 1899, the United States Department of War conducted a census of Puerto Rico finding that the population of Rocha barrio was 902.

Historical population
Census	Pop.	Note	%±
1900	902		—
1910	1,396		54.8%
1920	1,647		18.0%
1930	1,915		16.3%
1940	2,167		13.2%
1950	2,216		2.3%
1960	2,193		−1.0%
1970	2,273		3.6%
1980	3,130		37.7%
1990	3,067		−2.0%
2000	3,707		20.9%
2010	4,004		8.0%
U.S. Decennial Census; 1899 (shown as 1900) 1910-1930; 1930-1950 1960 1980-2000 2010

== Río Culebrinas flooding ==
In late May 2019, barrio Rocha and multiple areas in various municipalities suffered flooding, felled trees, landslides and closed highways when Río Culebrinas flooded.

== See also ==
- List of communities in Puerto Rico
