= Cuchillas, Moca, Puerto Rico =

Barrio of Puerto Rico

Cuchillas
- Barrio
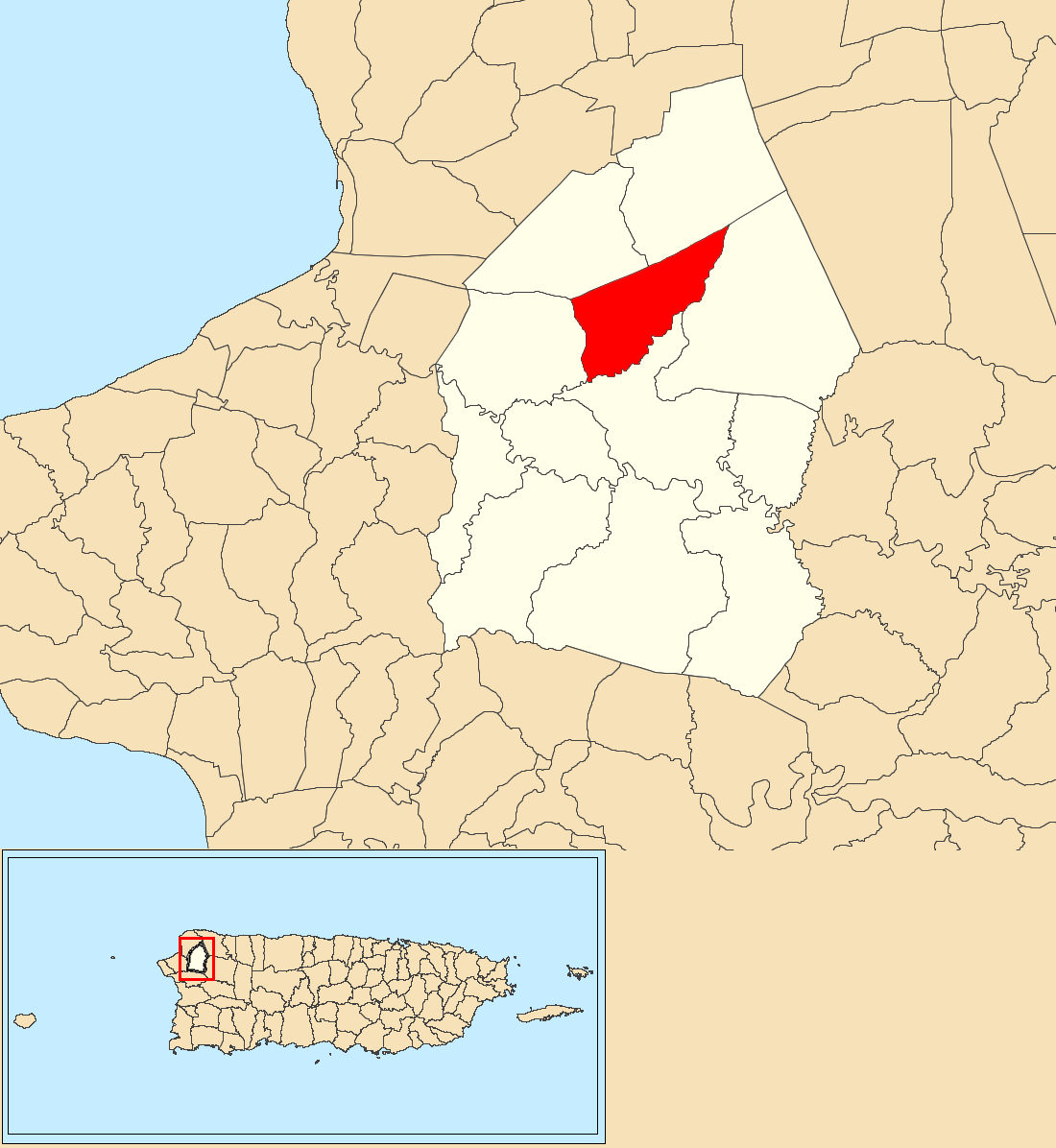
- Location of Cuchillas within the municipality of Moca shown in red

- Location of Puerto Rico
- Coordinates: 18°24′13″N 67°04′52″W
- Commonwealth: Puerto Rico
- Municipality: Moca

Area
  - Total: 2.85 sq mi (7.4 km^{2})
  - Land: 2.85 sq mi (7.4 km^{2})
  - Water: 0 sq mi (0 km^{2})
- Elevation: 545 ft (166 m)

Population (2010)
  - Total: 4,352
  - Density: 1,527/sq mi (590/km^{2})
- Source: 2010 Census
- Time zone: UTC−4 (AST)

Cuchillas is a barrio in the municipality of Moca, Puerto Rico. Its population in 2010 was 4,352.

== History ==
Cuchillas was in Spain's gazetteers until Puerto Rico was ceded by Spain in the aftermath of the Spanish–American War under the terms of the Treaty of Paris of 1898 and became an unincorporated territory of the United States. In 1899, the United States Department of War conducted a census of Puerto Rico finding that the population of Cuchillas barrio was 1,552.

Historical population
Census	Pop.	Note	%±
1900	1,552		—
1910	1,594		2.7%
1920	2,129		33.6%
1930	2,240		5.2%
1940	2,587		15.5%
1950	3,095		19.6%
1960	3,420		10.5%
1970	2,920		−14.6%
1980	3,589		22.9%
1990	3,967		10.5%
2000	4,507		13.6%
2010	4,352		−3.4%
U.S. Decennial Census; 1899 (shown as 1900) 1910-1930; 1930-1950 1960 1980-2000 2010

== See also ==
- List of communities in Puerto Rico
