= Naranjo, Moca, Puerto Rico =

Barrio of Puerto Rico

Naranjo
- Barrio
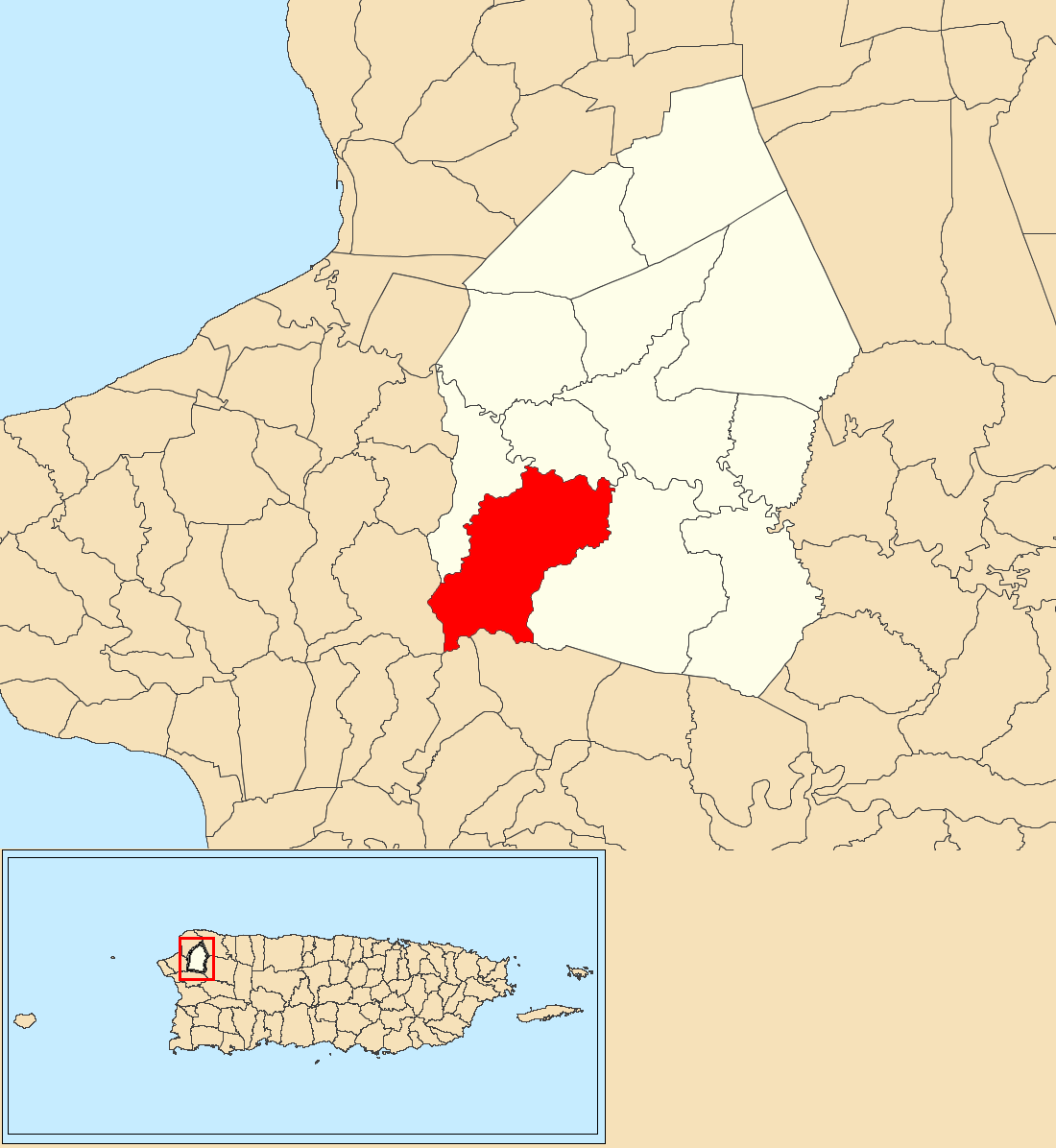
- Location of Naranjo within the municipality of Moca shown in red

- Location of Puerto Rico
- Coordinates: 18°20′33″N 67°06′42″W
- Commonwealth: Puerto Rico
- Municipality: Moca

Area
  - Total: 4.83 sq mi (12.5 km^{2})
  - Land: 4.83 sq mi (12.5 km^{2})
  - Water: 0 sq mi (0 km^{2})
- Elevation: 548 ft (167 m)

Population (2010)
  - Total: 2,875
  - Density: 595.2/sq mi (229.8/km^{2})
- Source: 2010 Census
- Time zone: UTC−4 (AST)

Naranjo is a barrio in the municipality of Moca, Puerto Rico. Its population in 2010 was 2,875.

== History ==
Naranjo was in Spain's gazetteers until Puerto Rico was ceded by Spain in the aftermath of the Spanish–American War under the terms of the Treaty of Paris of 1898 and became an unincorporated territory of the United States. In 1899, the United States Department of War conducted a census of Puerto Rico finding that the population of Naranjo barrio was 966.

Historical population
Census	Pop.	Note	%±
1900	966		—
1910	1,025		6.1%
1920	1,116		8.9%
1930	1,122		0.5%
1940	1,241		10.6%
1950	1,221		−1.6%
1960	1,298		6.3%
1970	1,380		6.3%
1980	1,865		35.1%
1990	2,405		29.0%
2000	2,690		11.9%
2010	2,875		6.9%
U.S. Decennial Census; 1899 (shown as 1900) 1910-1930; 1930-1950 1960 1980-2000 2010

== See also ==
- List of communities in Puerto Rico
