= Cerro Gordo, Moca, Puerto Rico =

Barrio of Puerto Rico

Cerro Gordo
- Barrio
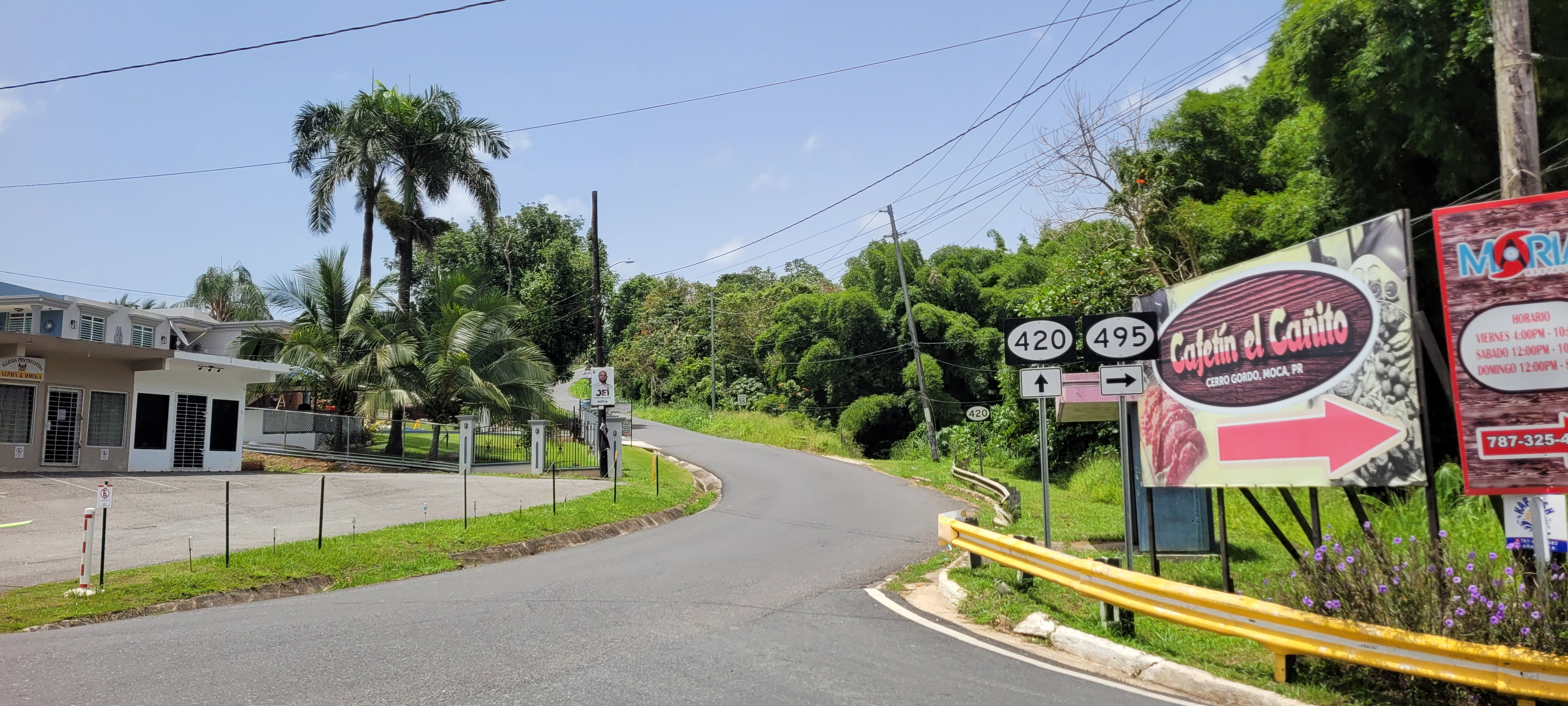
- Puerto Rico Highway 420 at Puerto Rico Highway 495 intersection in Cerro Gordo

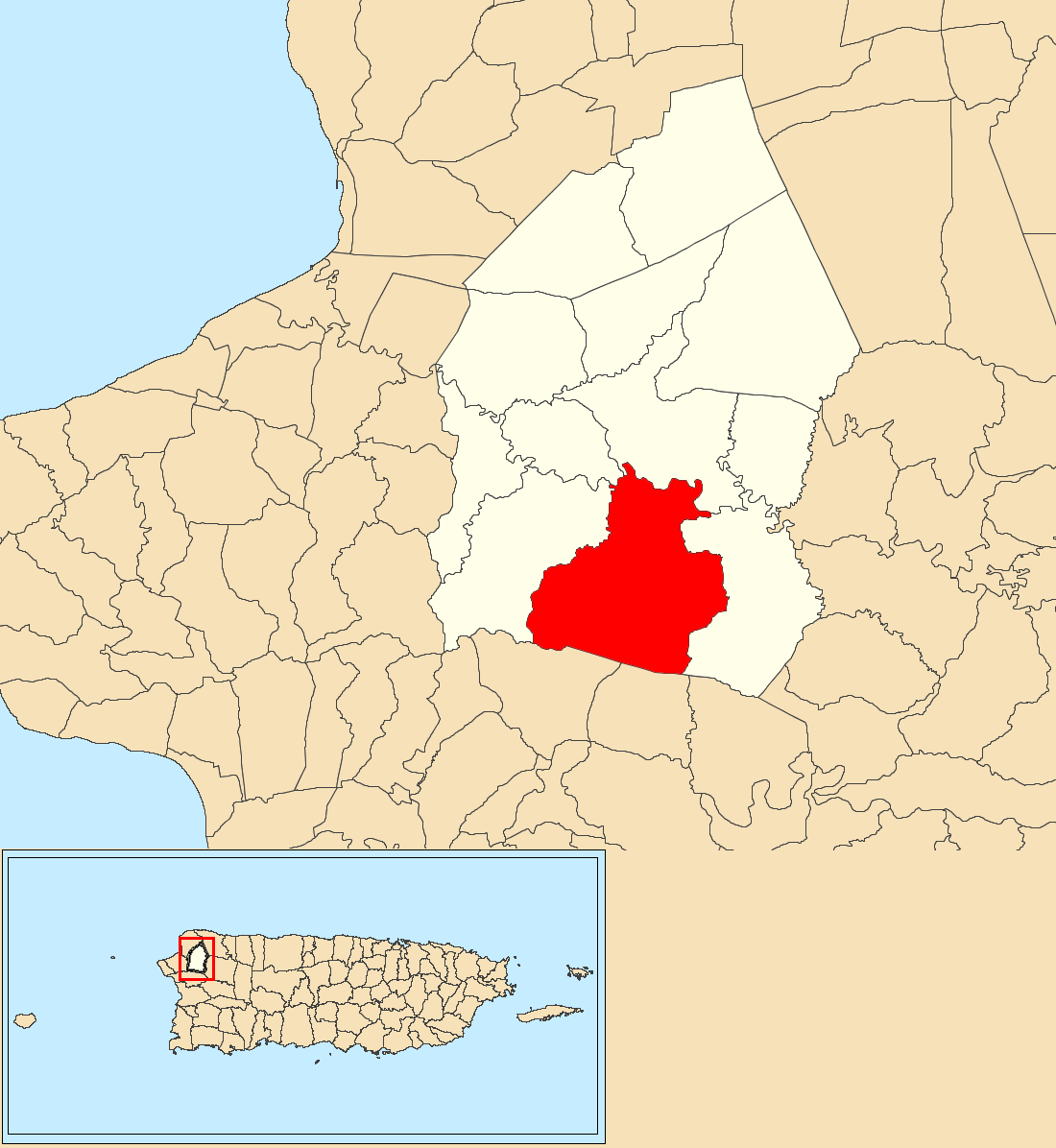
- Location of Cerro Gordo within the municipality of Moca shown in red

- Location of Puerto Rico
- Coordinates: 18°20′06″N 67°04′59″W
- Commonwealth: Puerto Rico
- Municipality: Moca

Area
  - Total: 6.84 sq mi (17.7 km^{2})
  - Land: 6.84 sq mi (17.7 km^{2})
  - Water: 0 sq mi (0 km^{2})
- Elevation: 285 ft (87 m)

Population (2010)
  - Total: 2,478
  - Density: 362.3/sq mi (139.9/km^{2})
- Source: 2010 Census
- Time zone: UTC−4 (AST)

Cerro Gordo is a barrio in the municipality of Moca, Puerto Rico with a population of 2,478 in 2010.

== History ==
Cerro Gordo was in Spain's gazetteers until Puerto Rico was ceded by Spain in the aftermath of the Spanish–American War under the terms of the Treaty of Paris of 1898 and became an unincorporated territory of the United States. In 1899, the United States Department of War conducted a census of Puerto Rico finding that the population of Cerro Gordo barrio was 1008.

Historical population
Census	Pop.	Note	%±
1900	1,008		—
1910	1,032		2.4%
1920	1,034		0.2%
1930	1,197		15.8%
1940	1,377		15.0%
1950	1,424		3.4%
1960	1,501		5.4%
1970	2,036		35.6%
1980	2,711		33.2%
1990	3,163		16.7%
2000	3,875		22.5%
2010	2,478		−36.1%
U.S. Decennial Census; 1899 (shown as 1900) 1910-1930; 1930-1950 1960 1980-2000 2010

== See also ==
- List of communities in Puerto Rico
