= Palacete Los Moreau =

House museum located in Moca, Puerto Rico

- Hacienda Iruena Manor House
- U.S. National Register of Historic Places
- Puerto Rico Historic Sites and Zones
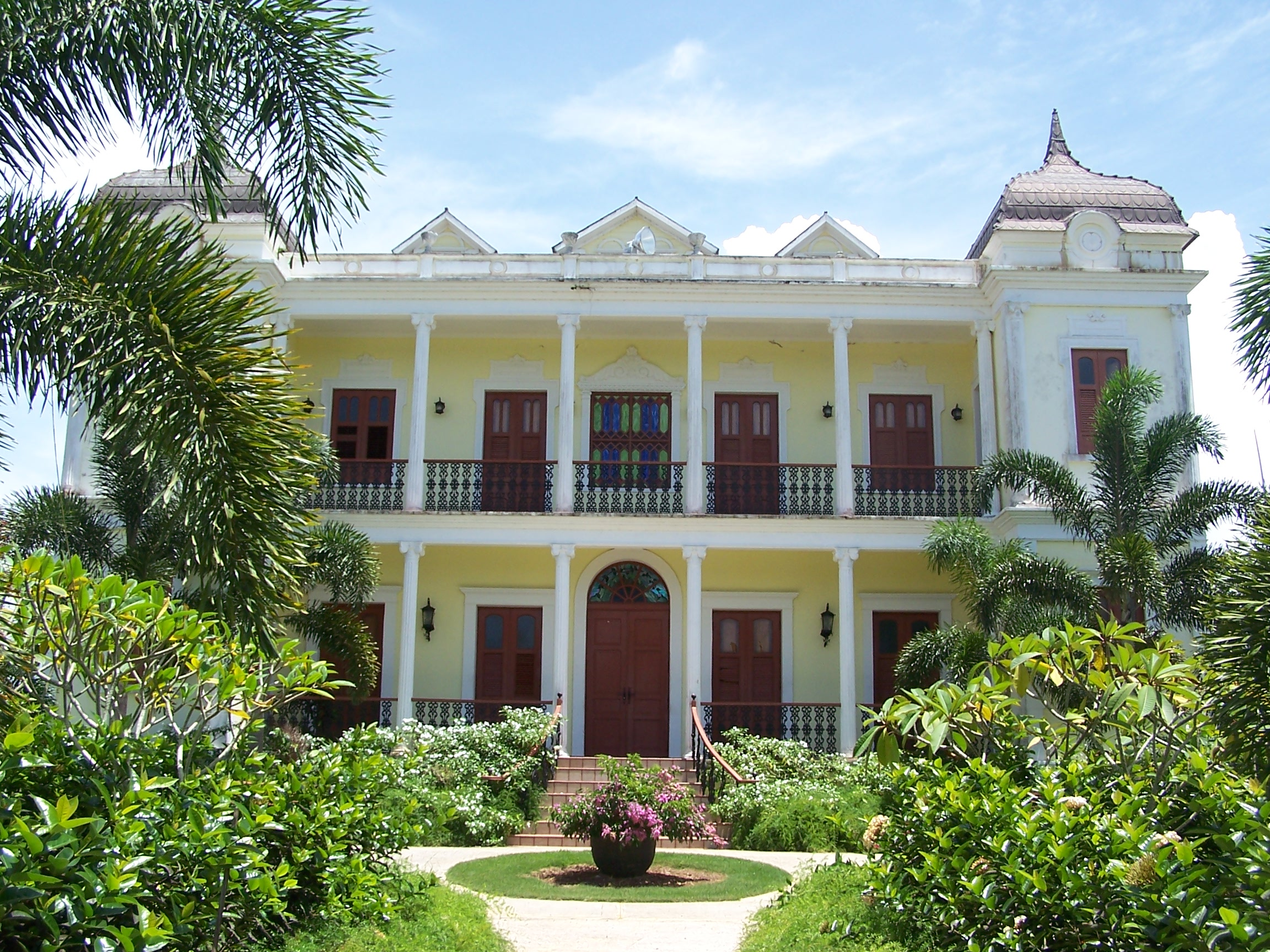
- The house in 2008

- Location within Puerto Rico
- Location: Highway 2, km 115.7; Barrio Aceitunas; Moca, Puerto Rico
- Coordinates: 18°27′11″N 67°03′41″W
- Area: less than one acre
- Built: 1893
- Architect: Serva, Paul
- Architectural style: Renaissance, French Chateau
- NRHP reference No.: 87000735
- RNSZH No.: 94-27-004-JP-SH

Significant dates
- Added to NRHP: August 14, 1987
- Designated RNSZH: May 4, 1994

Palacete Los Moreau is a house museum located in Moca, Puerto Rico. Historically known as the Labadie Mansion, the house inspired writer Enrique Laguerre to write La Llamarada. The property was restored as a museum and renamed the Palacete Los Moreau in honor of Laguerre's novel. It's listed on the National Register of Historic Places as Hacienda Iruena Manor House, and on the Puerto Rico Register of Historic Sites and Zones as the Labadie House.

== History ==
Built in 1893, it is the only building still standing of an agricultural conglomerate where both coffee and sugar were planted and processed. It belonged to the French family Pellot.

The hacienda was sold to Juan Labadié in 1860. At the time of acquisition, the property had an area of 1,300 acres, of which three quarters were planted with coffee. The other quarter was divided between cane, timber and cattle.

Juan Labadié lived on the plantation until his death in 1893. His widow, Cornelia Pellot decided to demolish the old house of wood to build a new one made out of concrete.

After the Spanish–American War Puerto Rico became a commonwealth of the United States in 1898, the estate became solely a sugar plantation belonging to Central Coloso.

== Architecture ==
Plans for the construction of the house started in 1893. The house was designed by Paul Servajean, the administrator of the sugar mill "Central Coloso" in Aguada. Serva conceived the design as a Caribbean adaptation of a Chateau in Châteauesque architecture. The main element of the house is the front porch that is flanked by two towers. One of the towers originally housed the library of the house.

== La Llamarada ==
The house, under the name “Hacienda Palmares de la Familia Moreau”, became immortalized in Puerto Rican literature by "La Llamarada", a novel about the Depression-era sugar cane industry written by Puerto Rican author Enrique Laguerre. He describes the house as it existed during the early 20th century, and the Moreau family are largely based upon the Labadies. Laguerre recognized how the novel transformed the house into a legend, "it's like when a great man dies, and literature replaced history and the legend begins."

In 1993 the municipality of Moca acquired the property and restored the house calling it "El Palacete Los Moreau" in honor of the novel. The estate is open free of charge to the public. In accordance with his wishes, Laguerre's body was cremated, and his ashes are interred in a small mausoleum on the grounds of the estate.
