= Moca barrio-pueblo =

Historical and administrative center (seat) of Moca, Puerto Rico

Moca barrio-pueblo Pueblo de Moca
- Municipality Seat
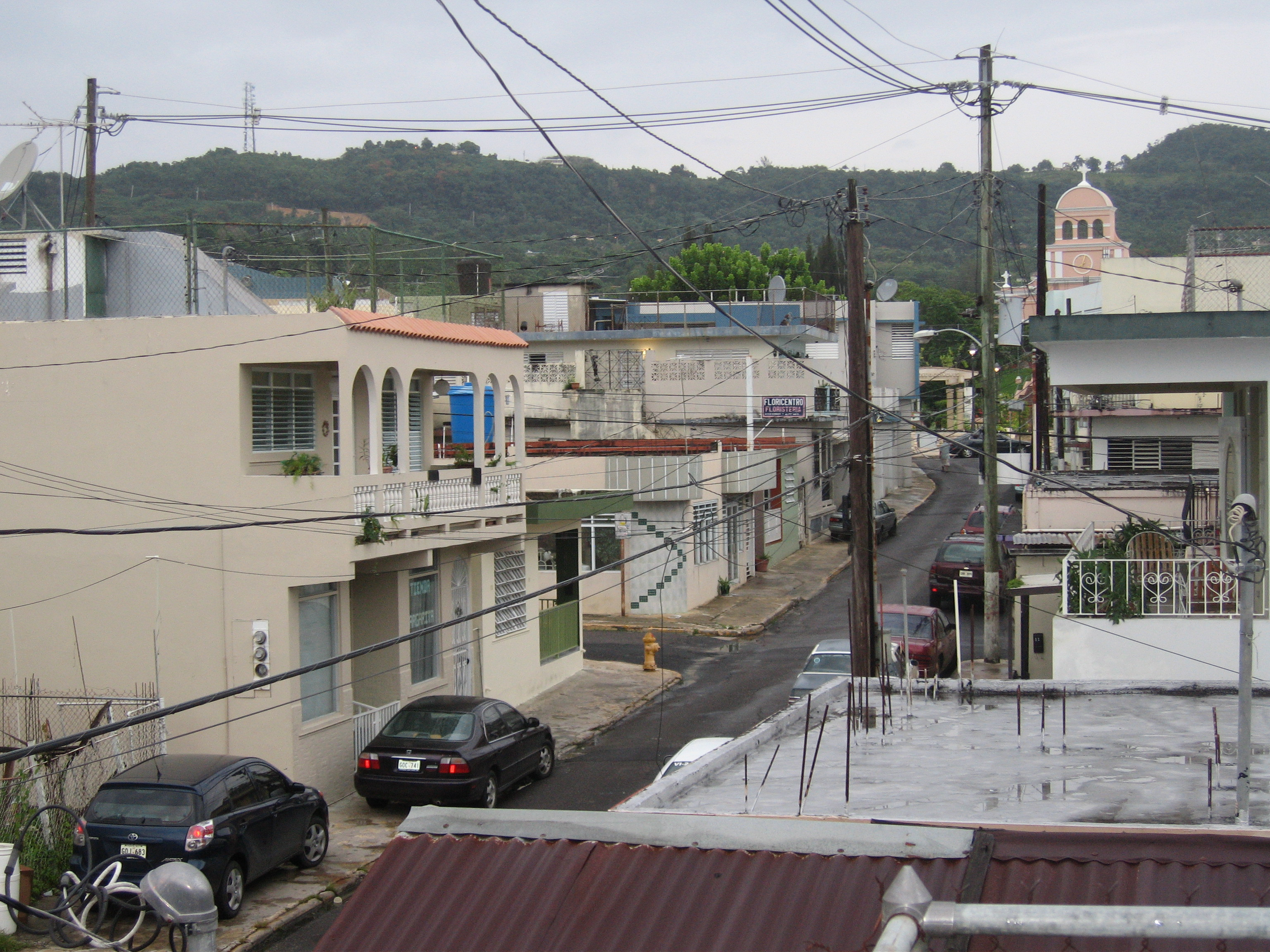
- Street in Moca barrio-pueblo

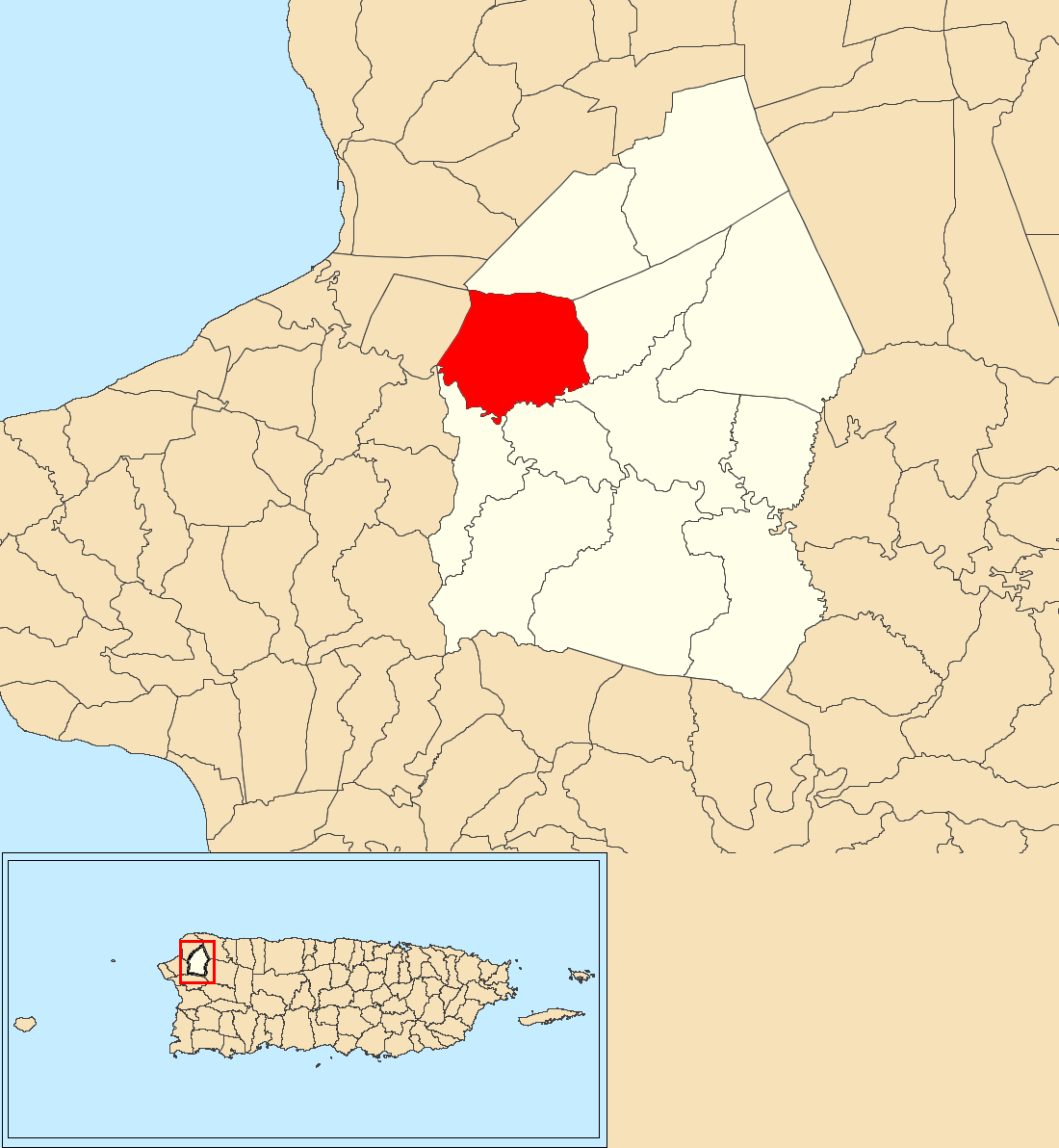
- Location of Moca barrio-pueblo in Moca, Puerto Rico

- Location of Puerto Rico
- Coordinates: 18°23′34″N 67°06′49″W
- Commonwealth: Puerto Rico
- Municipality: Moca

Area
  - Total: 0.32 sq mi (0.83 km^{2})
  - Land: 0.32 sq mi (0.83 km^{2})
  - Water: 0 sq mi (0 km^{2})
- Elevation: 105 ft (32 m)

Population (2010)
  - Total: 1,735
  - Density: 5,421.9/sq mi (2,093.4/km^{2})
- Source: 2010 Census
- Time zone: UTC−4 (AST)

Moca barrio-pueblo is a barrio and the administrative center (seat) of Moca, a municipality of Puerto Rico. Its population in 2010 was 1,735.

As was customary in Spain, in Puerto Rico, the municipality has a barrio which was called pueblo and since 1990 has been named barrio-pueblo. It contains a central plaza, the municipal buildings (city hall), and a Catholic church. Fiestas patronales (patron saint festivals) are held in the central plaza every year.

== The central plaza and its church ==
The central plaza, or square, is a place for official and unofficial recreational events and a place where people can gather and socialize from dusk to dawn. The Laws of the Indies, Spanish law, which regulated life in Puerto Rico in the early 19th century, stated the plaza's purpose was for "the parties" (celebrations, festivities) (Spanish: a propósito para las fiestas), and that the square should be proportionally large enough for the number of neighbors (Spanish: grandeza proporcionada al número de vecinos). These Spanish regulations also stated that the streets nearby should be comfortable portals for passersby, protecting them from the elements: sun and rain.

Located across the central plaza in Moca barrio-pueblo is the Parroquia Nuestra Señora de la Monserrate (English: Church Nuestra Señora de la Monserrate of Moca), a Roman Catholic church.

== History ==
Moca barrio-pueblo was in Spain's gazetteers until Puerto Rico was ceded by Spain in the aftermath of the Spanish–American War under the terms of the Treaty of Paris of 1898 and became an unincorporated territory of the United States. In 1899, the United States Department of War conducted a census of Puerto Rico finding that the population of Moca Pueblo was 1,470.

Historical population
Census	Pop.	Note	%±
1900	1,470		—
1910	1,585		7.8%
1920	1,717		8.3%
1930	2,164		26.0%
1940	3,005		38.9%
1950	1,961		−34.7%
1960	1,938		−1.2%
1970	0		−100.0%
1980	2,320		—
1990	2,059		−11.2%
2000	1,980		−3.8%
2010	1,735		−12.4%
U.S. Decennial Census; 1899 (shown as 1900) 1910-1930; 1930-1950 1960 1980-2000 2010

== Gallery ==
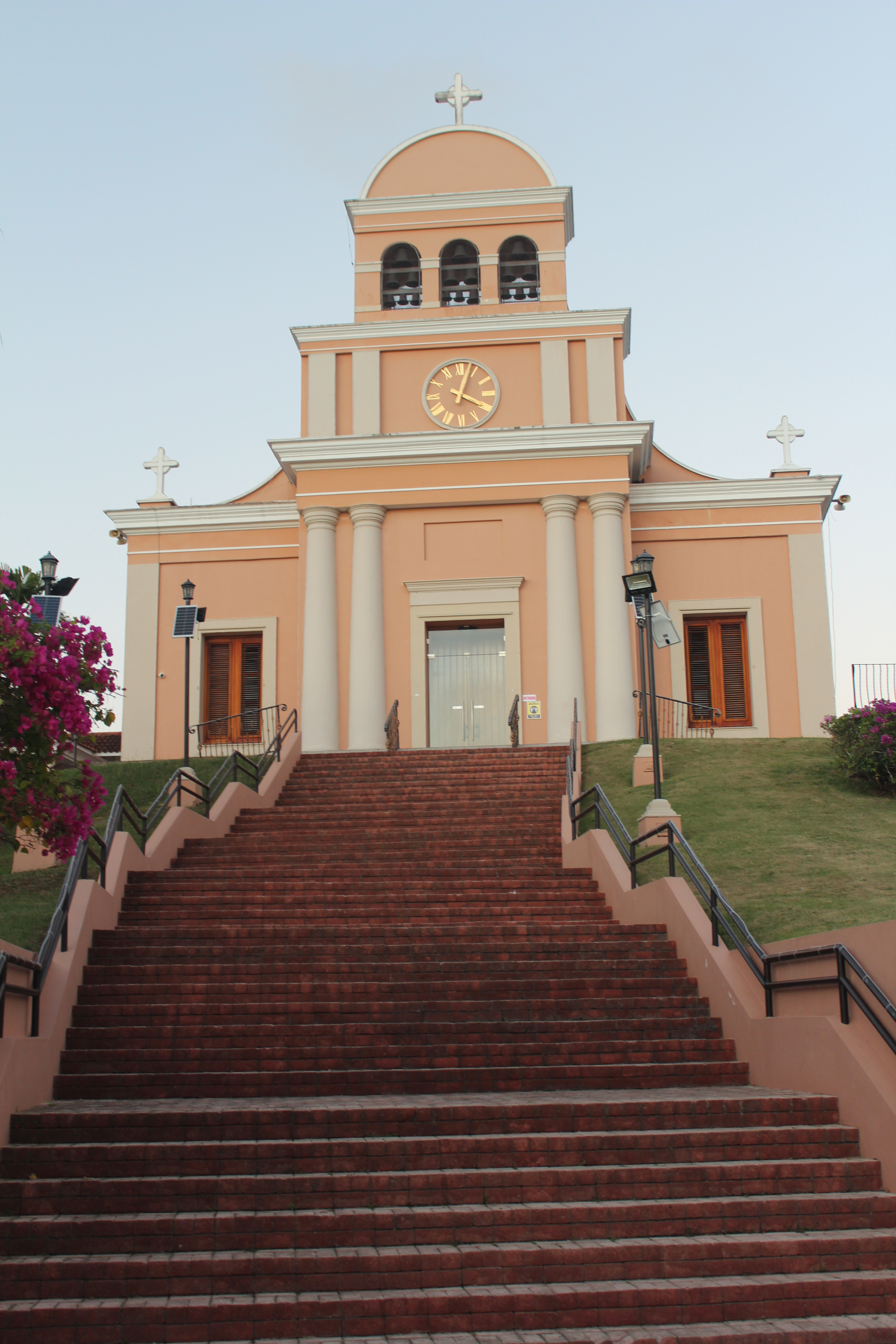
Catholic church in central plaza

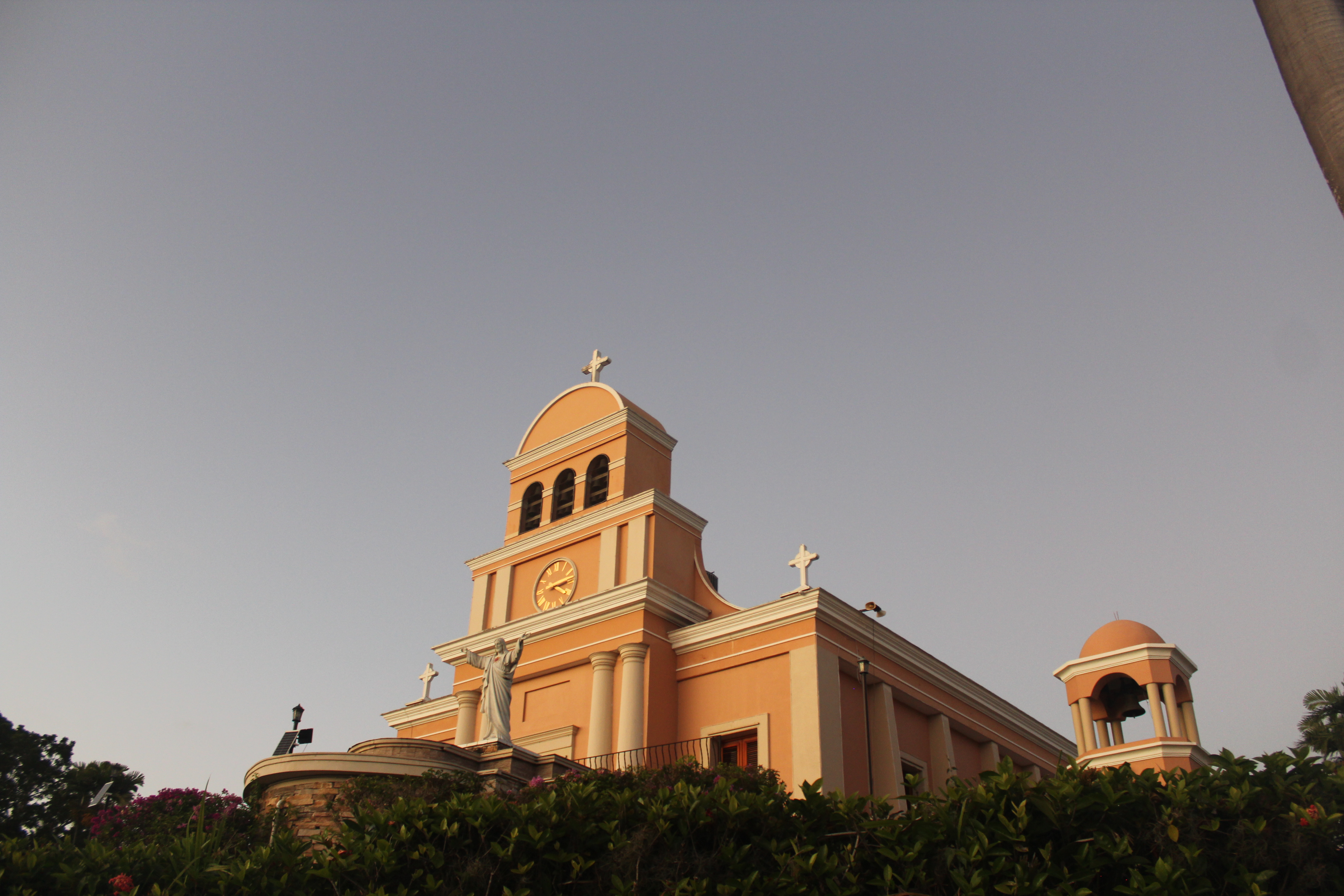
Panorama of church in central plaza

== See also ==
- List of communities in Puerto Rico
