= Cruz, Moca, Puerto Rico =

Barrio of Puerto Rico

Cruz
- Barrio
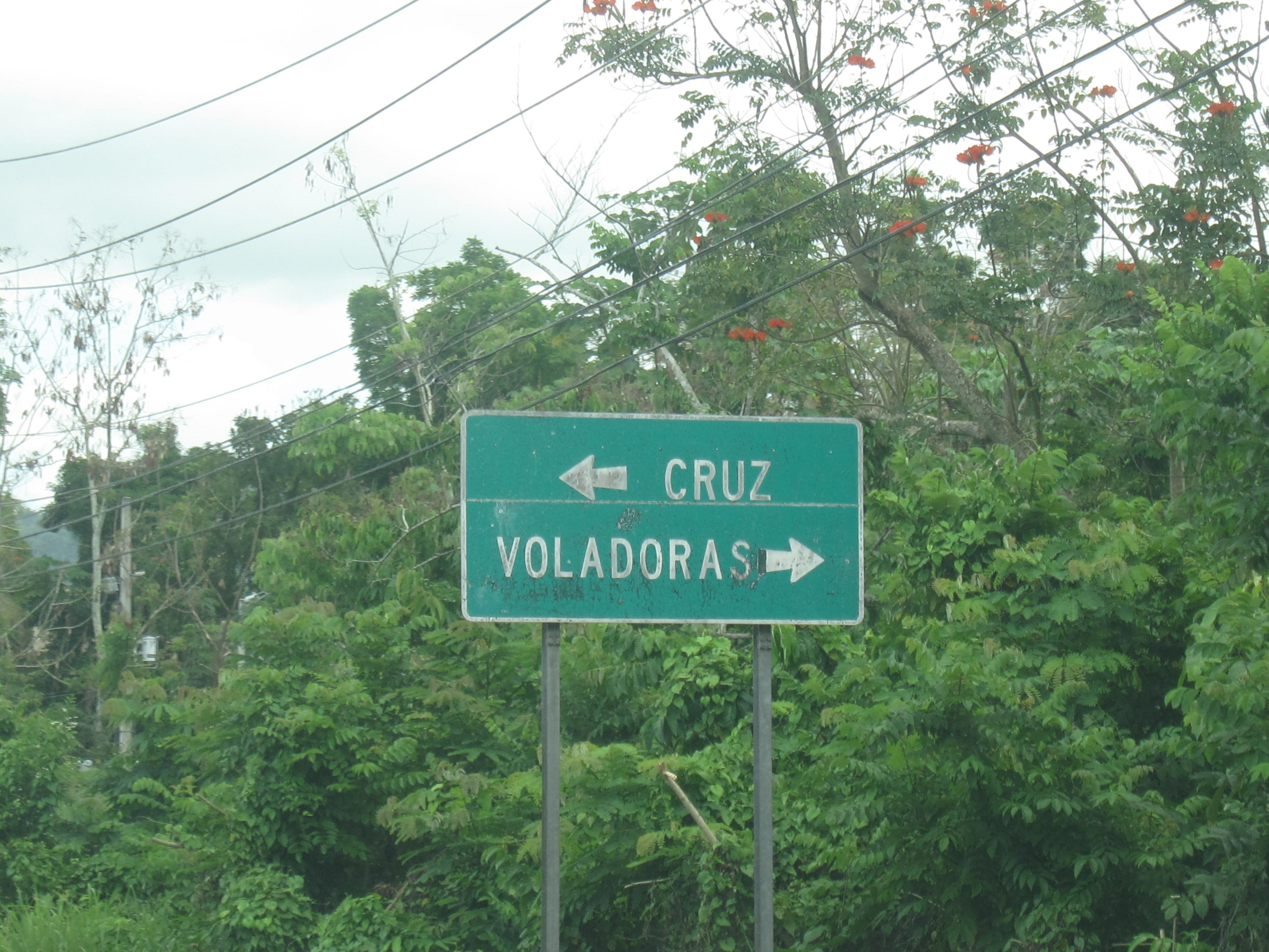
- Sign for barrio Voladoras and barrio Cruz in Moca

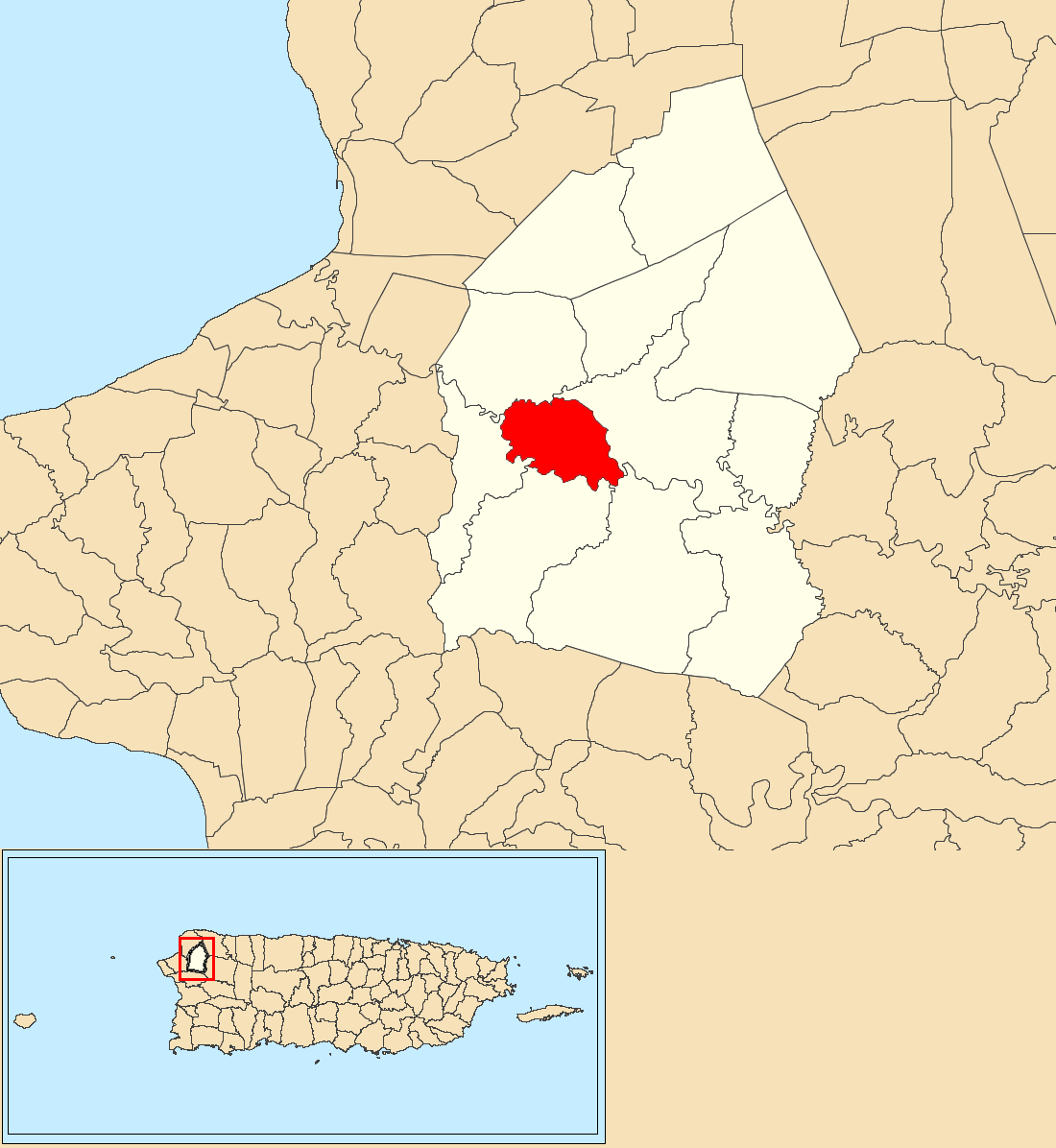
- Location of Cruz within the municipality of Moca shown in red

- Location of Puerto Rico
- Coordinates: 18°22′16″N 67°06′21″W
- Commonwealth: Puerto Rico
- Municipality: Moca

Area
  - Total: 1.97 sq mi (5.1 km^{2})
  - Land: 1.97 sq mi (5.1 km^{2})
  - Water: 0 sq mi (0 km^{2})
- Elevation: 430 ft (130 m)

Population (2010)
  - Total: 1,127
  - Density: 572.1/sq mi (220.9/km^{2})
- Source: 2010 Census
- Time zone: UTC−4 (AST)

Cruz is a barrio in the municipality of Moca, Puerto Rico. Its population in 2010 was 1,127.

== History ==
Cruz was in Spain's gazetteers until Puerto Rico was ceded by Spain in the aftermath of the Spanish–American War under the terms of the Treaty of Paris of 1898 and became an unincorporated territory of the United States. In 1899, the United States Department of War conducted a census of Puerto Rico finding that the population of Cruz barrio was 954.

Historical population
Census	Pop.	Note	%±
1900	954		—
1910	859		−10.0%
1920	923		7.5%
1930	1,061		15.0%
1940	1,202		13.3%
1950	1,272		5.8%
1960	1,065		−16.3%
1970	636		−40.3%
1980	853		34.1%
1990	936		9.7%
2000	1,147		22.5%
2010	1,127		−1.7%
U.S. Decennial Census; 1899 (shown as 1900) 1910-1930; 1930-1950 1960 1980-2000 2010

== Río Culebrinas flooding ==
In late May 2019, barrio Cruz and multiple areas in various municipalities suffered flooding, felled trees, landslides and closed highways when Río Culebrinas flooded.

== See also ==
- List of communities in Puerto Rico
