= Aceitunas =

Barrio of Moca, Puerto Rico

- Barrio
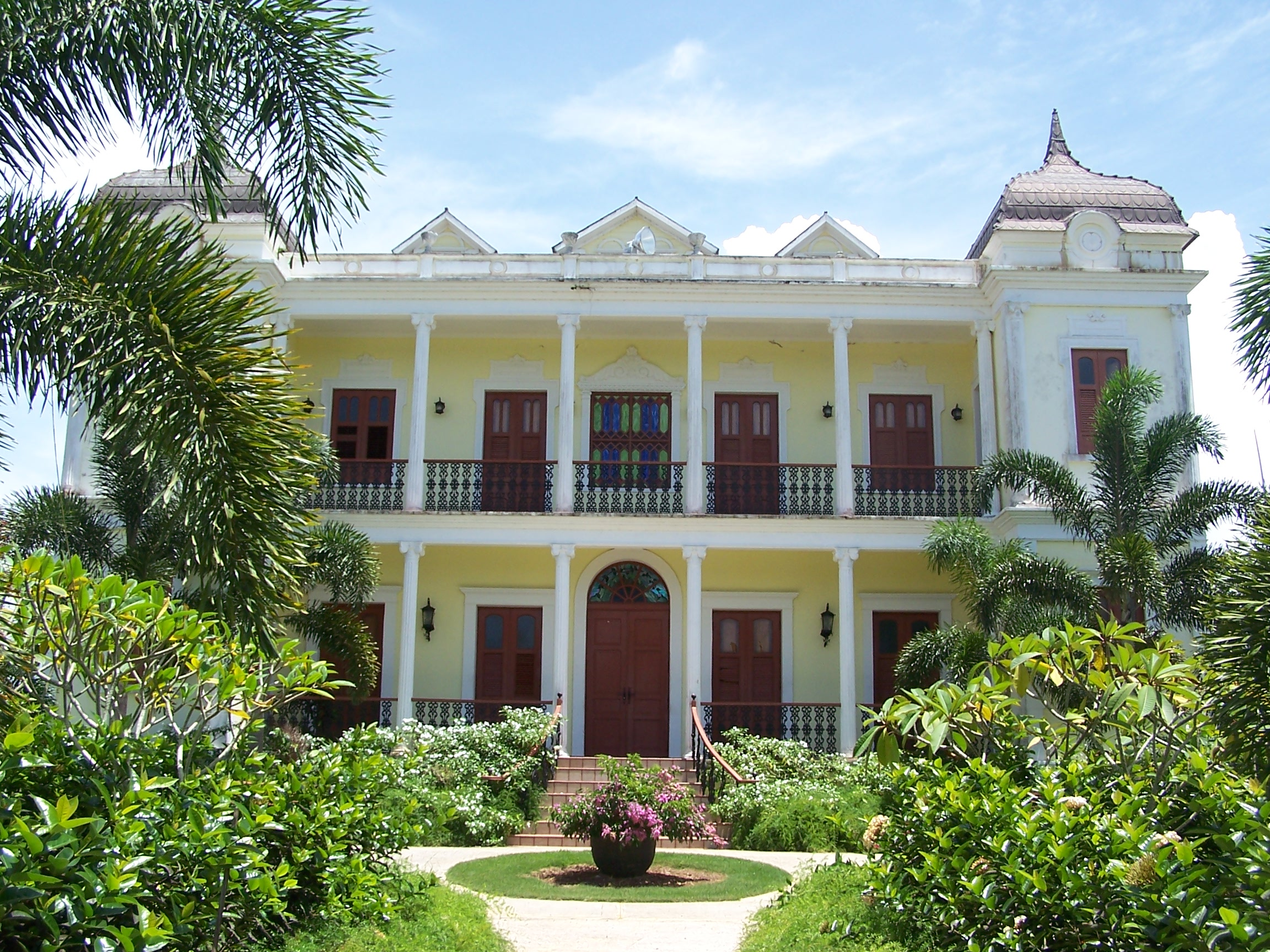
- Palacete Los Moreau in Aceitunas

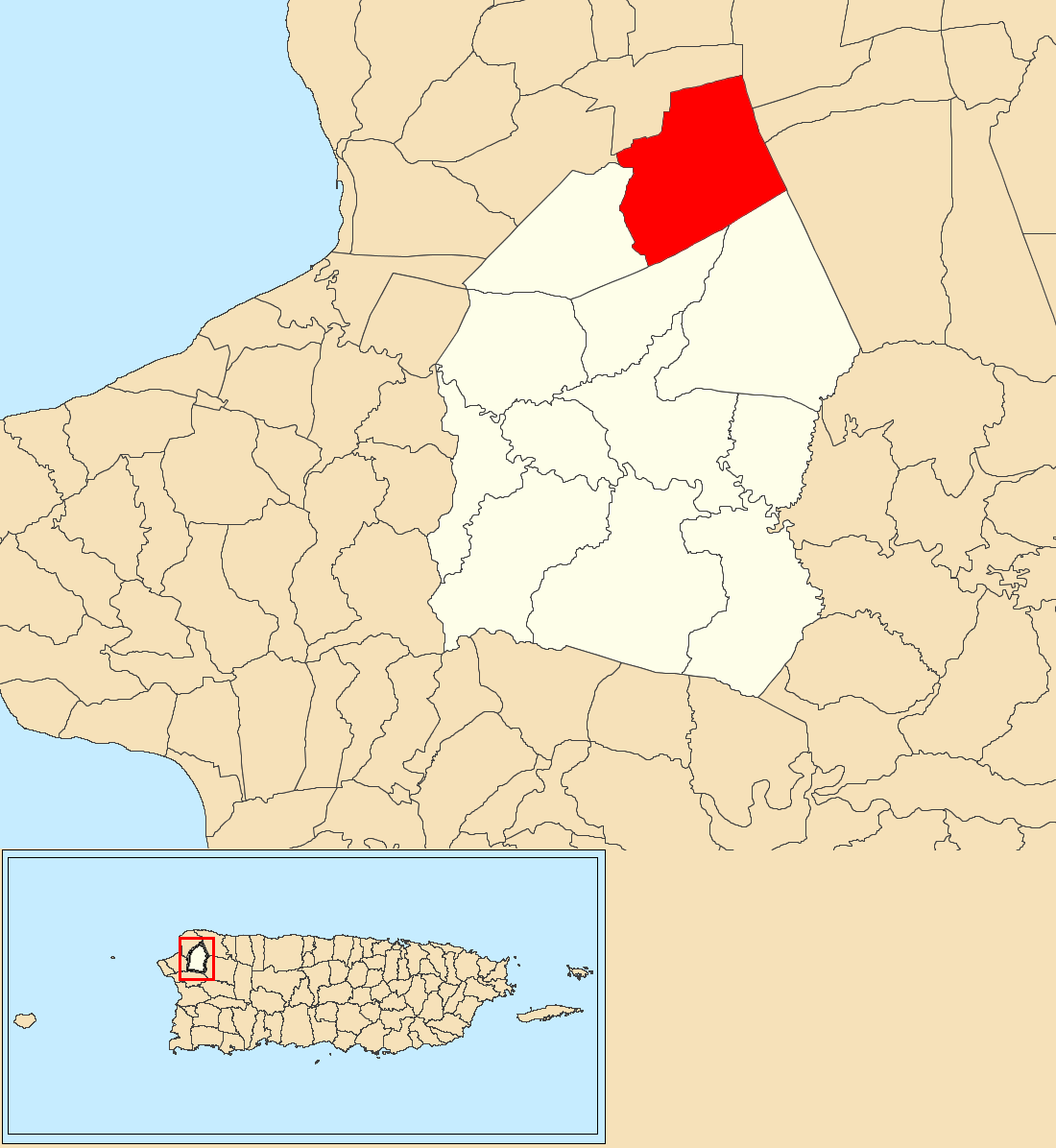
- Location of Aceitunas within the municipality of Moca shown in red

- Location of Puerto Rico
- Coordinates: 18°26′17″N 67°04′01″W
- Commonwealth: Puerto Rico
- Municipality: Moca

Area
  - Total: 5.36 sq mi (13.9 km^{2})
  - Land: 5.36 sq mi (13.9 km^{2})
  - Water: 0 sq mi (0 km^{2})
- Elevation: 545 ft (166 m)

Population (2010)
  - Total: 3,098
  - Density: 578/sq mi (223/km^{2})
- Source: 2010 Census
- Time zone: UTC−4 (AST)

Aceitunas (Spanish for 'olives') is a barrio in the municipality of Moca, Puerto Rico with a population of 3,098 in 2010. The land area of this subdivision is 5.36 square miles (13.9 km^{2}).

A neighborhood within Aceitunas barrio called Aceitunas community had a total population of 1,436 people in 2010, living in 0.26 square miles (0.67 km^{2}).

== History ==
Aceitunas was in Spain's gazetteers until Puerto Rico was ceded by Spain in the aftermath of the Spanish–American War under the terms of the Treaty of Paris of 1898 and became an unincorporated territory of the United States. In 1899, the United States Department of War conducted a census of Puerto Rico finding that the population of Aceitunas barrio was 1,067.

Historical population
Census	Pop.	Note	%±
1900	1,067		—
1910	1,196		12.1%
1920	1,472		23.1%
1930	1,466		−0.4%
1940	1,639		11.8%
1950	1,549		−5.5%
1960	1,794		15.8%
1970	2,015		12.3%
1980	2,656		31.8%
1990	2,932		10.4%
2000	3,199		9.1%
2010	3,098		−3.2%
U.S. Decennial Census; 1899 (shown as 1900) 1910-1930; 1930-1950 1960 1980-2000 2010

== Culebrinas River flooding ==
In late May 2019, Aceitunas and multiple other areas in various municipalities suffered flooding, felled trees, landslides and closed highways when Culebrinas River flooded.

== Notable people from Aceitunas ==
- Enrique Laguerre, writer

== Gallery ==
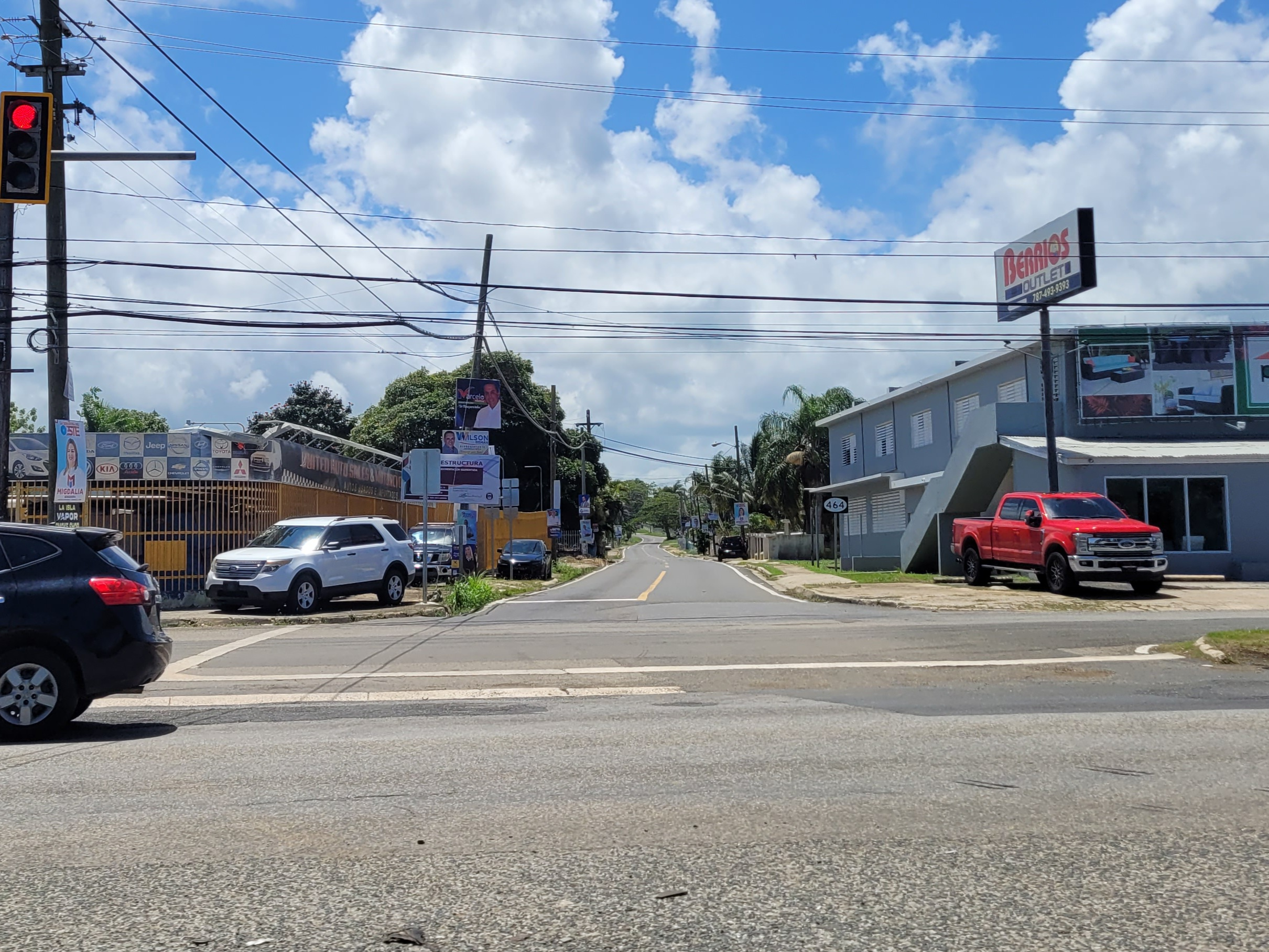
Puerto Rico Highway 464 in Aceitunas

== See also ==
- List of communities in Puerto Rico
