= Plata, Moca, Puerto Rico =

Barrio of Puerto Rico

Plata
- Barrio
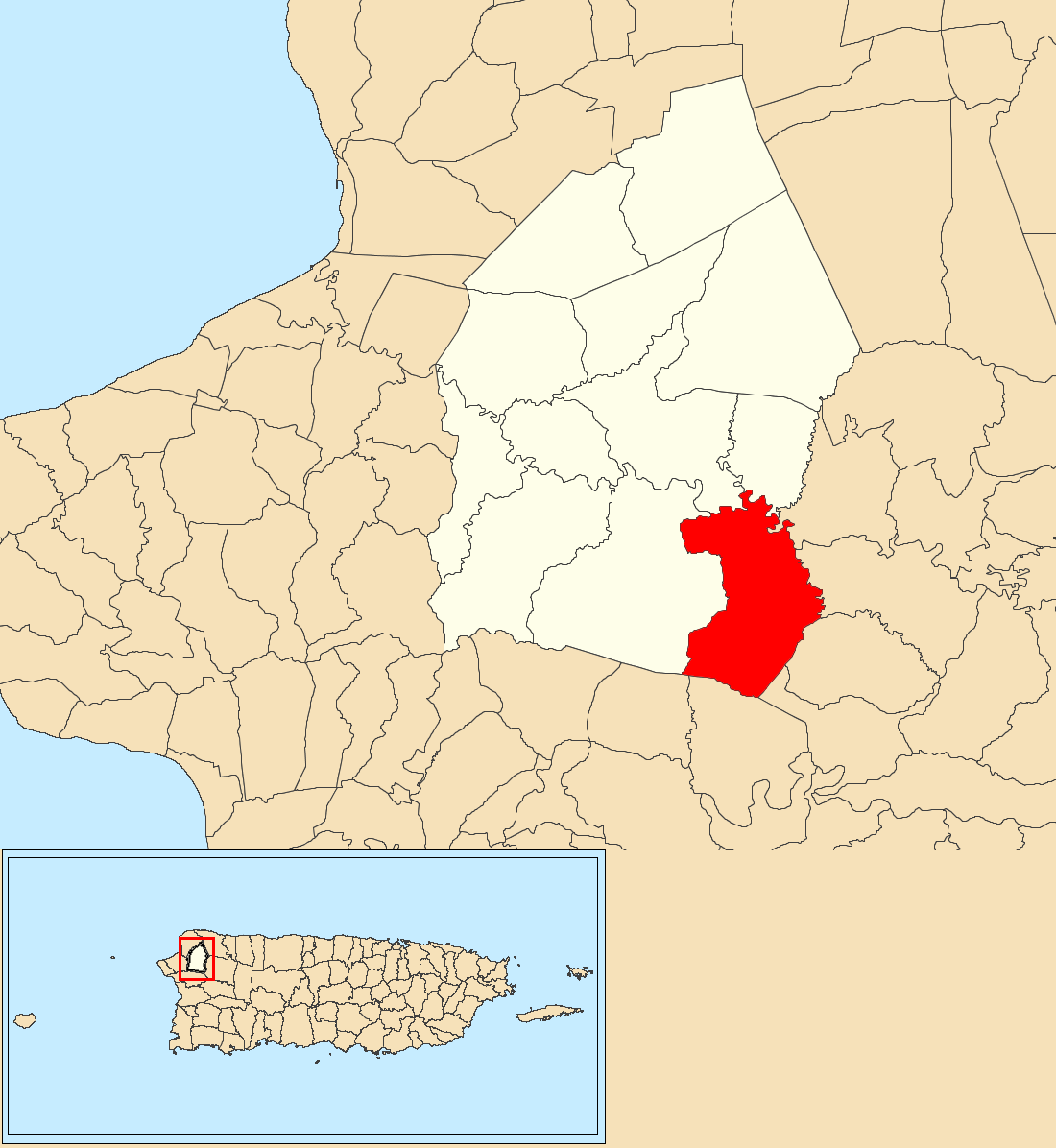
- Location of Plata within the municipality of Moca shown in red

- Location of Puerto Rico
- Coordinates: 18°19′53″N 67°03′15″W
- Commonwealth: Puerto Rico
- Municipality: Moca

Area
  - Total: 4.74 sq mi (12.3 km^{2})
  - Land: 4.74 sq mi (12.3 km^{2})
  - Water: 0 sq mi (0 km^{2})
- Elevation: 348 ft (106 m)

Population (2010)
  - Total: 2,797
  - Density: 590.1/sq mi (227.8/km^{2})
- Source: 2010 Census
- Time zone: UTC−4 (AST)

Plata is a barrio in the municipality of Moca, Puerto Rico. Its population in 2010 was 2,797.

== History ==
Plata was in Spain's gazetteers until Puerto Rico was ceded by Spain in the aftermath of the Spanish–American War under the terms of the Treaty of Paris of 1898 and became an unincorporated territory of the United States. In 1899, the United States Department of War conducted a census of Puerto Rico finding that the population of Plata barrio was 663.

Historical population
Census	Pop.	Note	%±
1900	663		—
1910	698		5.3%
1920	862		23.5%
1930	693		−19.6%
1940	893		28.9%
1950	1,078		20.7%
1960	1,067		−1.0%
1970	557		−47.8%
1980	693		24.4%
1990	602		−13.1%
2000	996		65.4%
2010	2,797		180.8%
U.S. Decennial Census; 1899 (shown as 1900) 1910-1930; 1930-1950 1960 1980-2000 2010

== See also ==
- List of communities in Puerto Rico
