= Moca, Puerto Rico =

Town and municipality in Puerto Rico

Moca Moca Colony
- Town and Municipality
- Moca
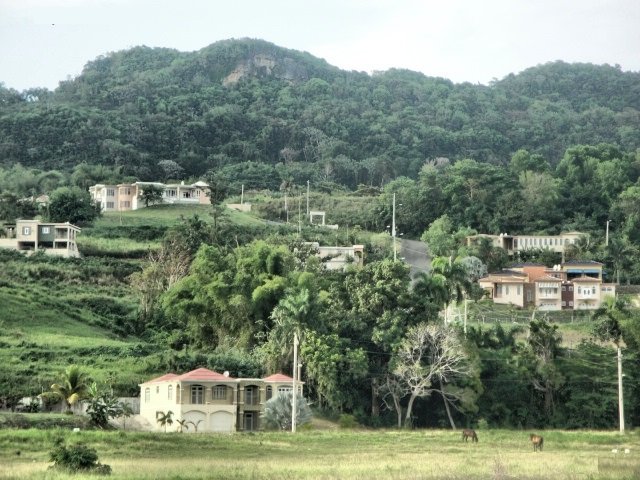
- Mountains and homes in Moca

- Flag Coat of arms
- Nicknames: "Rebeldes", "Los Vampiros", "La Ciudad del Mundillo"
- Anthem: "Doce barrios, doce estrellas"
- Map of Puerto Rico highlighting Moca Municipality
- Coordinates: 18°23′41″N 67°06′48″W
- Sovereign state: United States
- Commonwealth: Puerto Rico
- Founded: June 22, 1772
- Barrios: 13 barrios: Aceitunas; Capá; Centro; Cerro Gordo; Cruz; Cuchillas; Marías; Moca barrio-pueblo; Naranjo; Plata; Pueblo; Rocha; Voladoras

Government
  - Mayor: Efraín 'Franco' Barreto (PPD)
  - Senatorial dist.: 4 - Mayagüez
  - Representative dist.: 17,18

Area
  - Total: 51.4 sq mi (133.0 km^{2})
  - Land: 51 sq mi (133 km^{2})
  - Water: 0 sq mi (0 km^{2})

Population (2020)
  - Total: 37,460
  - Estimate (2025): 37,562 ▲
  - Rank: 28th in Puerto Rico
  - Density: 729/sq mi (282/km^{2})
- Demonym: Mocanos
- Time zone: UTC−4 (AST)
- ZIP Code: 00676
- Area code: 787/939

Moca (Spanish pronunciation: [ˈmoka]) is a barrio-pueblo and municipality of Puerto Rico, located in the north-western region of the island, north of Añasco; southeast of Aguadilla; east of Aguada; and west of Isabela and San Sebastián. Moca is spread over 12 barrios and Moca Pueblo (the downtown area and the administrative center). It is part of the Aguadilla-Isabela-San Sebastián Metropolitan Statistical Area.

The name comes from the Moca tree (Andira inermis) which are very common in this region.

The Moca tree was officially adopted as the representative tree of the town on February 19, 1972. Moca is famous for its Mundillo lace. Mundillo is a Puerto Rican-style of handmade bobbin lace. Mundillo almost synonymous with the small town of Moca.

== History ==
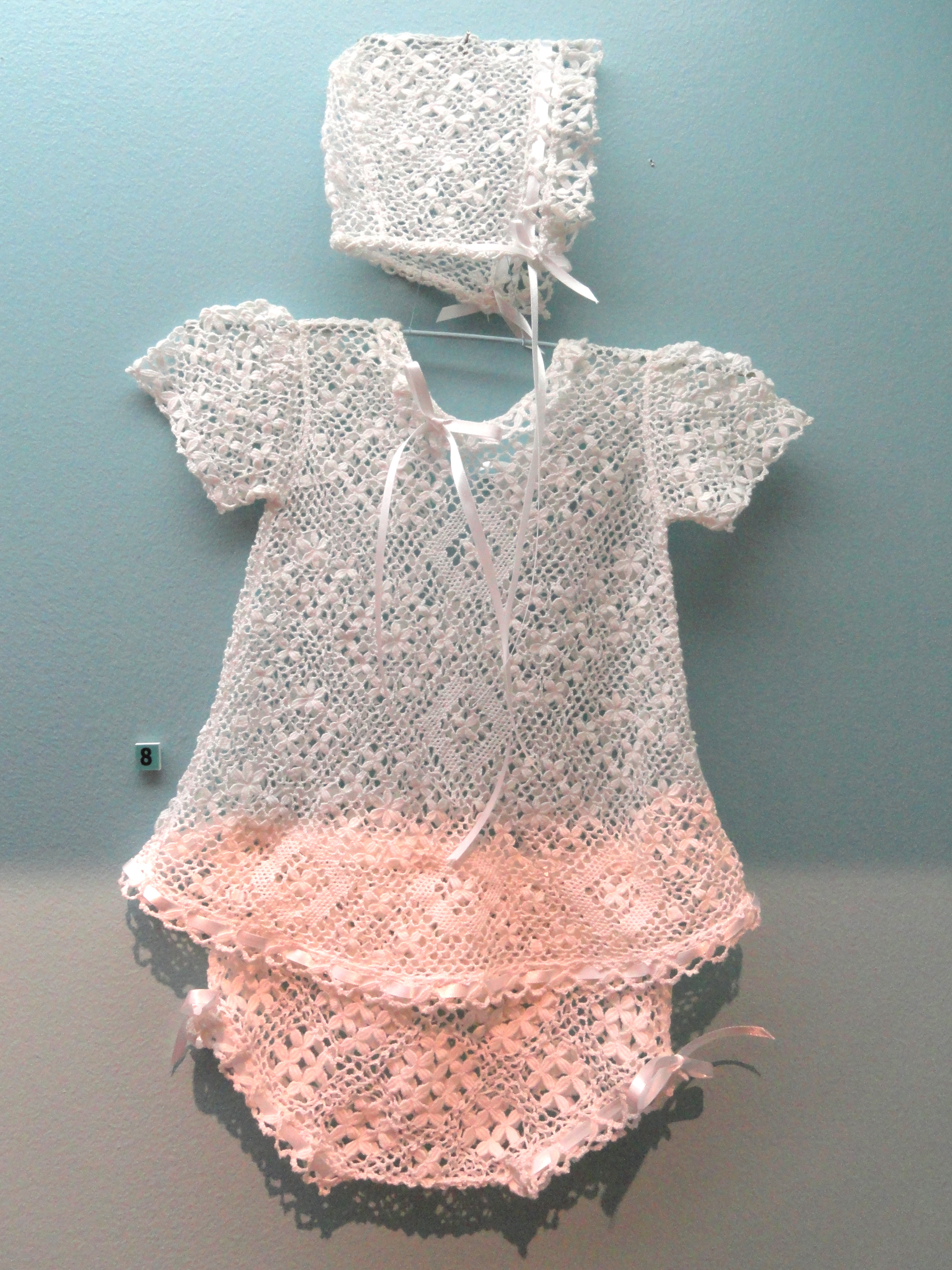
Lace baby clothing from the clothing collection in the Museo de las Américas in Old San Juan

Moca, known as La Capital del Mundillo (The Mundillo Capital), is famous for its lace or Mundillo. It was founded by Don José de Quiñones on June 22, 1772. Diverse versions exist on the date of its foundation. Manuel de Ubeda and Delgado, in his "Isla de Puerto Rico. "Estudio histórico, geográfico y estadístico", published in San Juan in 1878, says Moca was founded in 1774. On the other hand, Cayetano Coll y Toste, in the "Boletín histórico de Puerto Rico", maintains it was founded on June 22, 1772.

In 1841, construction of the main parish, “Parroquia Nuestra Señora de la Monserrate” began.

Slavery was legal in Puerto Rico until 22 March 1873—and thus, Moca by extension is known to have had slave populations within its boundaries. The populations are recorded as such:

- 1775: 48 (29 men and 19 women).
- 1828: 625.

Moca’s own founder Don José de Quiñones was also a slave owner, his slaves were known to have been baptized. In 1945, Leoncia Lasalle and Juana Rodríguez Lasalle who were 112 and 85 respectively, were recorded as having been slaves of Marcelino Lasalle. They recorded a powerful testimony regarding their time as slaves.

In 1870, the Electoral Law stated that in order to be eligible to vote, the person must have:

1. Economic capacity: contribute to the economy.
2. Intellectual capacity: be able to read and write.
3. Employment capacity: be a public worker.

or be a “Cura Ecónomo” of the town. Out of all the citizens recorded in 1891 in Moca, only 106 were “capable of voting”—and out of this number, only 86 were actually eligible.

Puerto Rico was ceded by Spain in the aftermath of the Spanish–American War under the terms of the Treaty of Paris of 1898 and became an unincorporated territory of the United States.In 1899, the United States Department of War conducted a census of Puerto Rico finding that the population of Moca was 12,410.

On May 16, 2010, Moca was the epicenter of a strong 5.8 earthquake. The earthquake was felt in the entire island and also in the Dominican Republic and the Virgin Islands. Damage was reported in various towns.

On September 20, 2017 Hurricane Maria struck Puerto Rico. In Moca, landslides and the flooding of the Río Culebrinas caused major destruction to bridges, roads and homes. About 1300 homes were impacted by landslides and flooding, bridges collapsed, and residents were left without access to electrical power, telecommunication services and basic necessities. Close to a month and a half later, 25% of the 31,117 residents of Moca had electrical power and access to drinking water and 75% did not.

== Geography ==
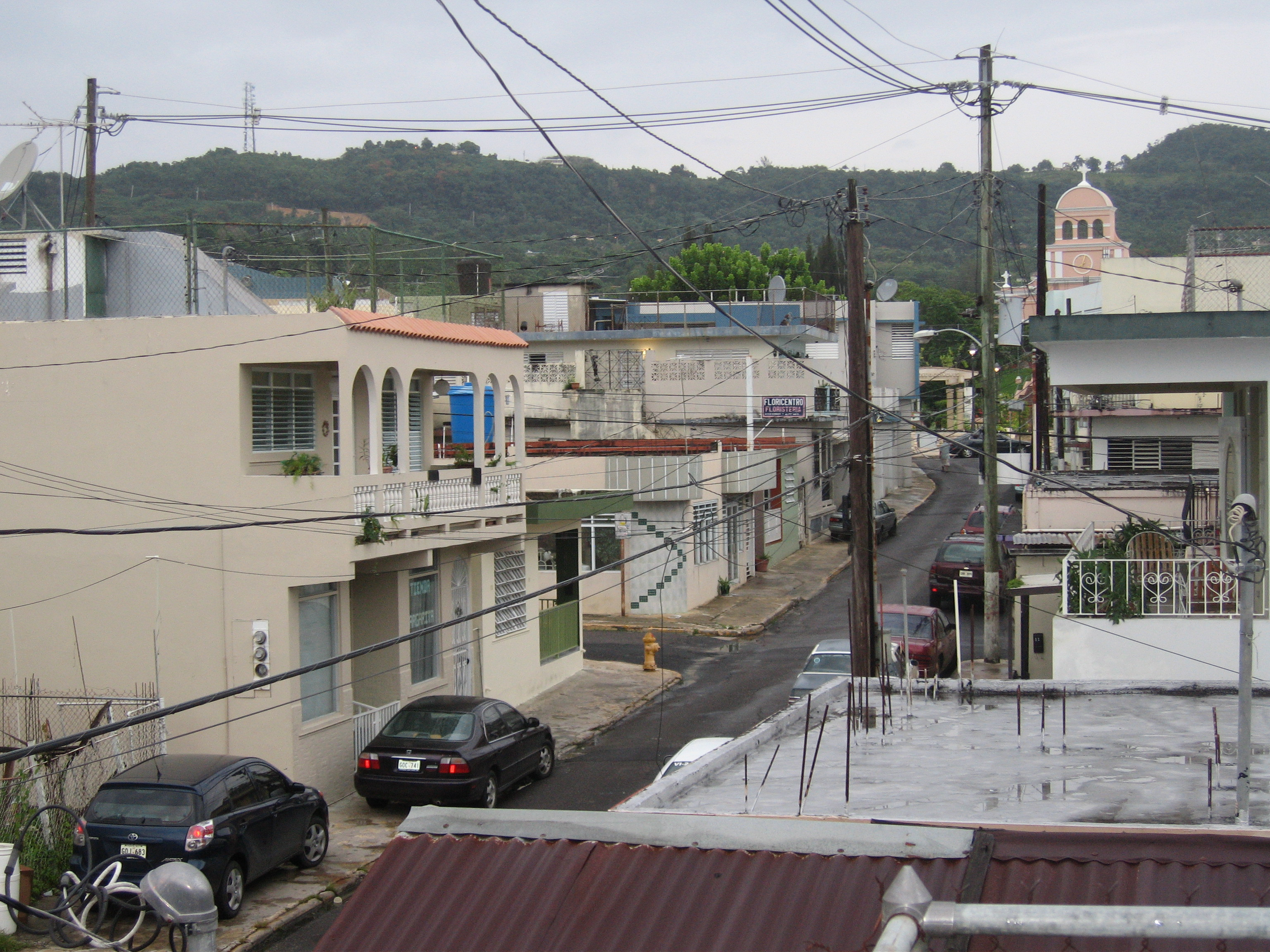
A street in Moca barrio-pueblo, August 2006

Moca is located on the northwest part of the island on the northern karst region of Puerto Rico.

Climate: Tropical with hardly noticeable seasonal changes, temperatures in Moca range from highs of between 76 and 98 °F (24 and 37 °C) and lows between 50 and 75 °F (10 and 24 °C).

Hydrography: The Río Culebrinas crosses its territory from east to west, and its tributaries include the gorges of Los Gatos, Lassalle, de las Damas, Vieja, Los Romanes, the Morones, Higuillo, Chiquita, Yagruma, Echeverria, Aguas Frias, Las Marias, de los Méndez, La Caraíma, Grande, y Dulce. Cerro Moca, Monte El Ojo, Monte Mariquita of the Jaicoa Mountain Range.

=== Barrios ===
Like all municipalities of Puerto Rico, Moca is subdivided into barrios. The municipal buildings, central square and large Catholic church are located in a barrio called Moca barrio-pueblo.

1. Aceitunas
2. Capá
3. Centro
4. Cerro Gordo
5. Cruz
6. Cuchillas
7. Marías
8. Moca barrio-pueblo
9. Naranjo
10. Plata
11. Pueblo
12. Rocha
13. Voladoras

=== Sectors ===
Barrios (which are, in contemporary times, roughly comparable to minor civil divisions) and subbarrios, are further subdivided into smaller areas called sectores (sectors in English). The types of sectores may vary, from normally sector to urbanización to reparto to barriada to residencial, among others.

=== Special Communities ===
Comunidades Especiales de Puerto Rico (Special Communities of Puerto Rico) are marginalized communities whose citizens are experiencing social exclusion. A map shows these communities occur in nearly every municipality of Puerto Rico. Of the 742 places that were on the list in 2014, the following barrios, communities, sectors, or neighborhoods were in Moca: Aceituna, Sector Isleta in Cruz barrio, Parcelas Acevedo and Parcelas Mamey in Moca barrio-pueblo, and Loperena.

== Demographics ==
Historical population
Census	Pop.	Note	%±
1900	12,410		—
1910	13,640		9.9%
1920	15,791		15.8%
1930	17,089		8.2%
1940	19,716		15.4%
1950	21,614		9.6%
1960	21,990		1.7%
1970	22,361		1.7%
1980	29,185		30.5%
1990	32,926		12.8%
2000	39,697		20.6%
2010	40,109		1.0%
2020	37,460		−6.6%
2025 (est.)	37,562	▲	0.3%
U.S. Decennial Census; 1899 (shown as 1900) 1910-1930; 1930-1950 1960-2000 2010 2020

Historically, when Puerto Rico was part of the Spanish Empire the population of Moca is recorded as the following:

- 1775: 1,051 souls.
- 1828: 5,906 souls.
- 1868: 10,924 souls.

In 2020, the U.S. Census indicated that Moca had a total population of 37,012 inhabitants, a 7.7% decline from 2010.

== Economy ==
- Agriculture: Fruits, dairy farming, cattle and bovine ranching.
- Business:
- Industrial: Alarms, clothing, electronic machinery, footwear, plastic products.
- Services: Lawyers, engineers, appraisers

== Tourism ==
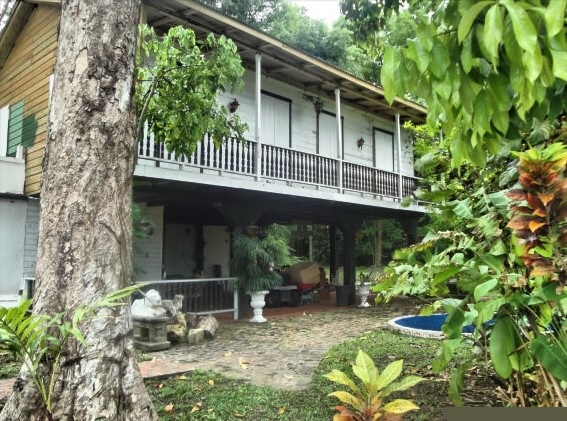
Museo Hacienda La Enriqueta in Moca

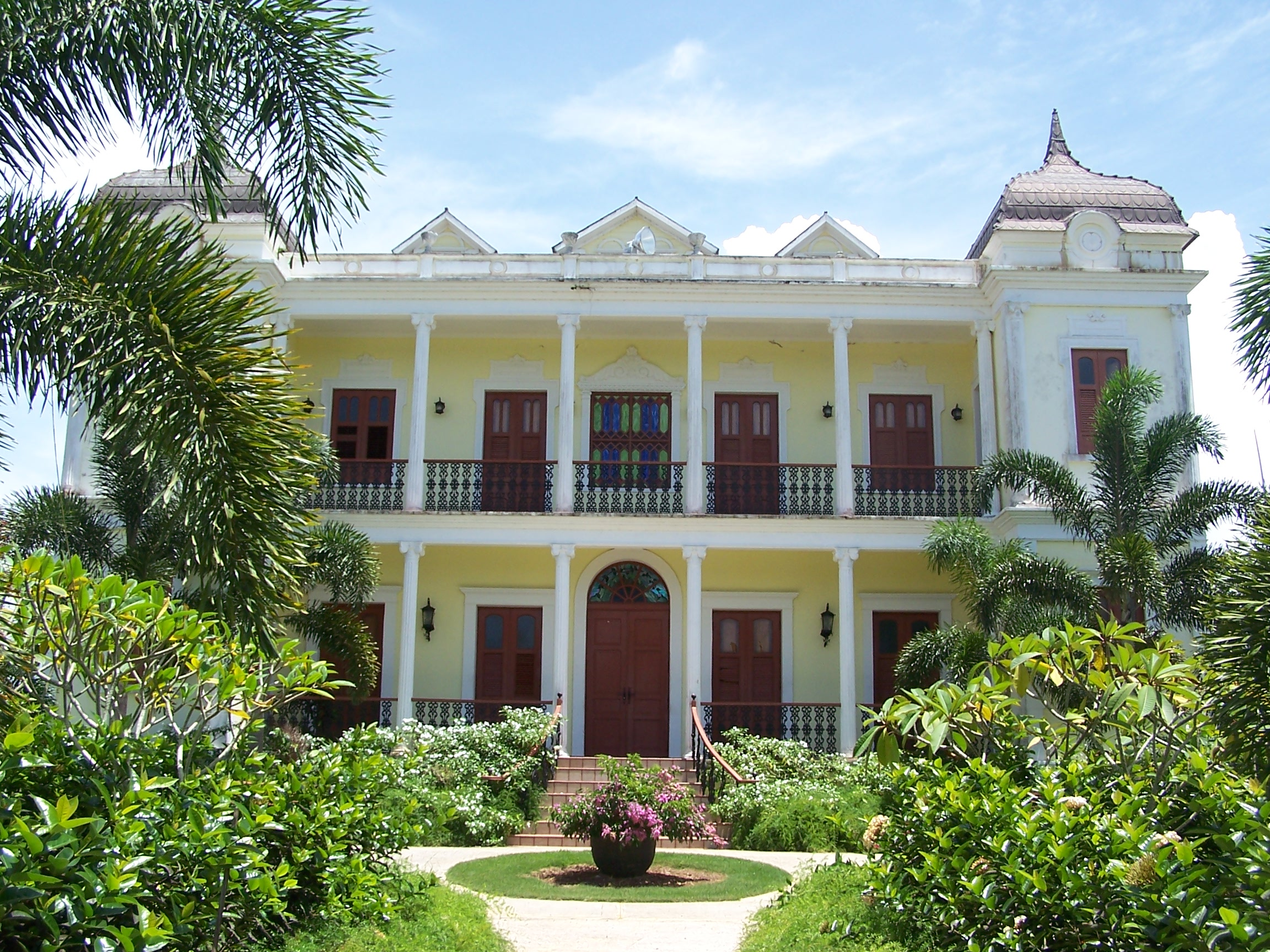
The Labadie Mansion inspired Enrique Laguerre to write La Llamarada. The property was restored as a museum and renamed the Palacete Los Moreau, in honor of Laguerre's fictional characters.

=== Landmarks and places of interest ===
- Palacete Los Moreau
- Enrique Laguerre House
- Hacienda Enriqueta Museum
- Mundillo Museum
- Our Lady of Monserrate Parish Church and Town Hall on the main plaza

== Culture ==
=== Festivals and events ===
Moca celebrates its patron saint festival in late August or early September. The Fiestas Patronales Nuestra Señora de la Monserrate is a religious and cultural celebration that generally features parades, games, artisans, amusement rides, regional food, and live entertainment.

=== Sports ===
Moca has a Double-A (baseball) team called the Moca Vampiros that play in the Superior Baseball League.

- Juan Sanchez Acevedo Coliseum

Moca also had a volleyball team named Los Rebeldes, which played in LVS (Liga de Voleibol Superior) from 1998 to 2005. The team went to the post season every year, and obtained a controversial second place in its 1998 final with Los Changos of Naranjito. In addition, Los Rebeldes were National Champions against Los Changos in the 2000 final. Los Rebeldes swept the Los Changos 4–0 in the finals.

=== Vampire myth ===
Moca is famous for El vampiro de Moca (Spanish for "Moca vampire"), considered a predecessor to the Chupacabra urban legend. Although there have been reports of vampire-like attacks on farm animals from as early as the 1930s, El vampiro de Moca legend officially began on February 25, 1975, when newspapers reported that fifteen cows, three goats, two geese and a pig were found with puncture marks on their blood-drained bodies in Rocha, Moca. These events were also connected to UFO sightings and other supernatural reports by residents of Moca. Similar events were reported throughout 1975 in the towns of Corozal, Fajardo and even rural parts of San Juan. The legend resurfaced in the 1990s after similar reports came from Canóvanas.

== Government ==
Like all municipalities in Puerto Rico, Moca is administered by a mayor. The current mayor is Efraín Franco Barreto from the Popular Democratic Party (PPD) was elected at the 2024 general election.

The city belongs to the Puerto Rico Senatorial district IV, which is represented by two Senators. In 2024, Jeison Rosa and Karen Michelle Román Rodríguez, both from the New Progressive Party (PNP), were elected as District Senators.

=== Mayors ===
Mayor	Year
José de Quiñónez	(1772-1783)
Francisco Hernández	(1784-1789)
Marín Lorenzo de Acevedo	(1790-1808)
Francisco de Nieves	(1820)
Antonio de Rivera Quiñónez	(1826-1827)
Miguel Polidoro	(1828-1829)
Antonio Rivera y Quiñónez	(1830-1831)
Capitán Jaime Cedó	(1832)
Miguel Polidoro	(1833)
José Pérez del Río	(1839)
Francisco Babilonia Acevedo	(1841)
Francisco Ruíz	(1844)
Gabriel Seguí	(1848-1849)
José Simón Romero	(1849)
Antonio B. y Sanz	(1849)
Casimiro Gutiérrez y Cañedo	(1853)
Pedro María García	(1854)
Pedro García	(1858-1860)
Julián López Pitral	(1861)
Carlos González	(1864)
Sebastián Porrata	(1865)
Salvador Valls y Burgueras	(1866-1867)
Francisco Delgado	(1867)
Restituto Pagán	(1867)
Pedro San Antonio	(1867)
Salustiano Sierra	(1868)
Melquíades Ginoro	(1869)
Manuel González	(1869)
Restituto Cabán	(1871-1879)
Ramón Méndez y Quiñónez	(1879-1882)
Ramón E. Martínez	(1883)
Federico Clascar	(1884-1886)
Restituto Pagán	(1887)
Agustín Hernández Mora	(1887-1888)
Francisco Molina y Nebot	(1888-1890)
Sandalio Valencia	(1890-1891)
Fulgencio Muñiz	(1892-1893)
Benito García López	(1894-1896)
Pedro Acevedo Rivera	(1897-1898)
Juan Clímaco Sánchez	(1899)
José Lao Polanco	(1900-1901)
Fausto Morales	(1902)
Miguel Babilonia	(1902-1905)
Miguel Babilonia	(1905-1910)
Nemesio González	(1911-1920)
Francisco Acevedo Nieves	(1921-1928)
José Calazán Lasalle	(1929-1932)
Arístides Maisonave	(1933-1940)
Alejandro Galarza	(1941-1944)
Arcadio Colón Serrano	(1945-1952)
Áureo Sánchez Pérez	(1953-1962)
Nicasio Loperena	(1963-1965)
Santiago Cordero Soto	(1965-1968)
Fermín Medina	(1969-1972)
Nicasio Loperena	(1973-1976)
Juan Sánchez Acevedo	(1977-1984)
Juan "Chule" de J. Méndez	(1985-1988)
Eustaquio Vélez Hernández	(1989-2000)
José E. "Kiko" Avilés Santiago	(2001-2020)
Ángel "Beto" Pérez Rodríguez	(2021-2024)
Efraín "Franco" Barreto	(2025-Presente)

== Transportation ==
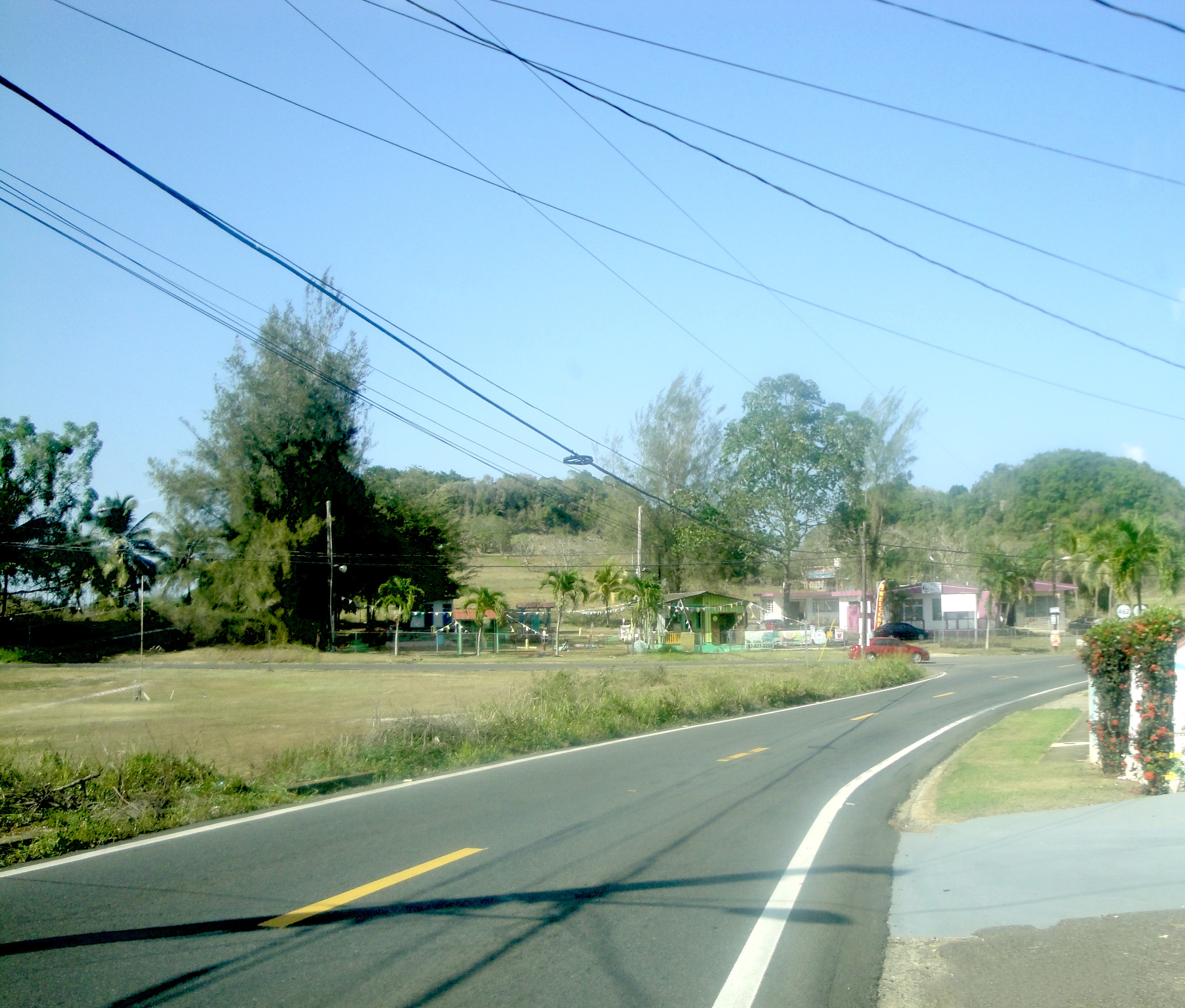
PR-462 bordering Moca and Aguadilla

There are 12 bridges in Moca. Moca, like the rest of Puerto Rico, had a public share taxi system or Carros Públicos, with set routes.

Rafael Hernández Airport in the neighboring municipality of Aguadilla is a commercial airport which is nearby.

== Symbols ==
The municipio has an official flag and coat of arms.

=== Flag ===
Augusto Hernández Méndez designed Moca's flag. The rectangular flag consists of a magenta equilateral triangular field, the color of the Moca tree flower. In this field appear five-point stars, silver-plated, surrounding a greater gold star, also with five points.

=== Coat of arms ===
It has oblong form. Divided in a silver-plated field and blue sky united by a purple rhombus (diamond shape), the color of the Moca flower. The rhombus has religious symbolisms. The rhombus is surrounded, in its inferior part, by two branches of the Moca tree; in its superior part, an arc of eleven silver-plated five-point stars. Within the rhombus is a gold monogram (of the Virgin Mary) topped by a Christian crown of the same metal. A silver-lined crown in form of a three-tower castle crowns the shield. On the frontal portion of the crown, carved in gold, the word Moca. The stones of the castle are lined in blue. The doors and windows are purple.

== Gallery ==
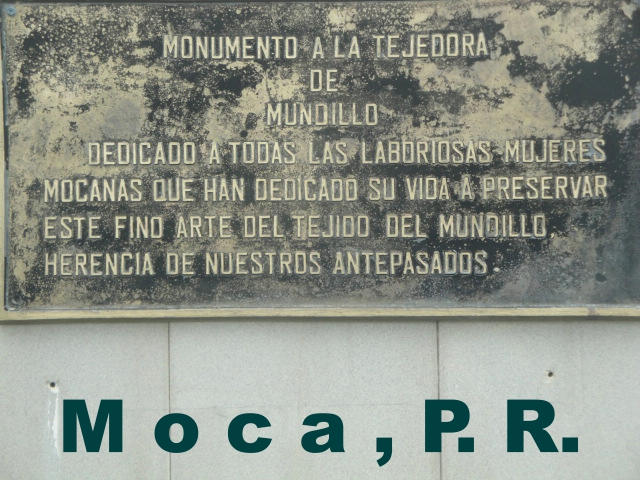
Monumento a la Tejedora plaque in Moca

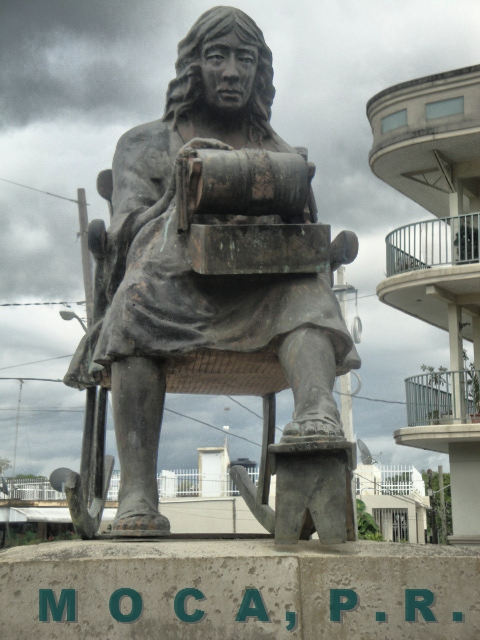
Monument to women from Moca who work in lace

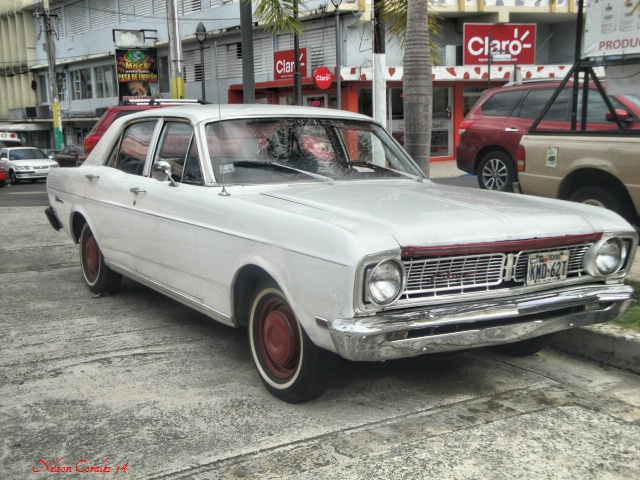
Old car in Moca barrio-pueblo

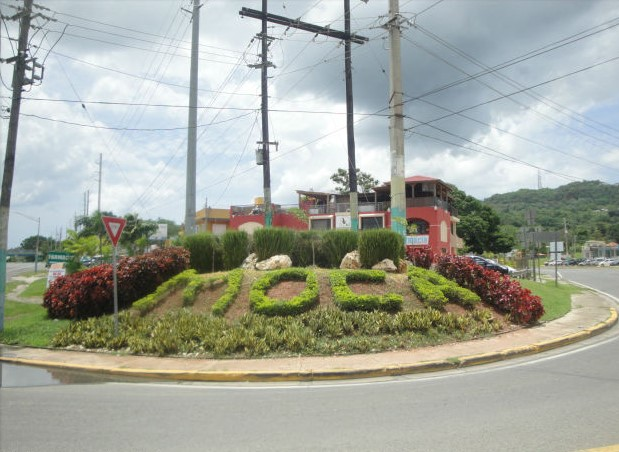
Moca in landscape

== See also ==
- List of Puerto Ricans
- History of Puerto Rico
- National Register of Historic Places listings in Moca, Puerto Rico
- Did you know-Puerto Rico?
