= Mundillo =

Handmade bobbin lace, tradition and cultural heritage of Puerto Rico and Panama

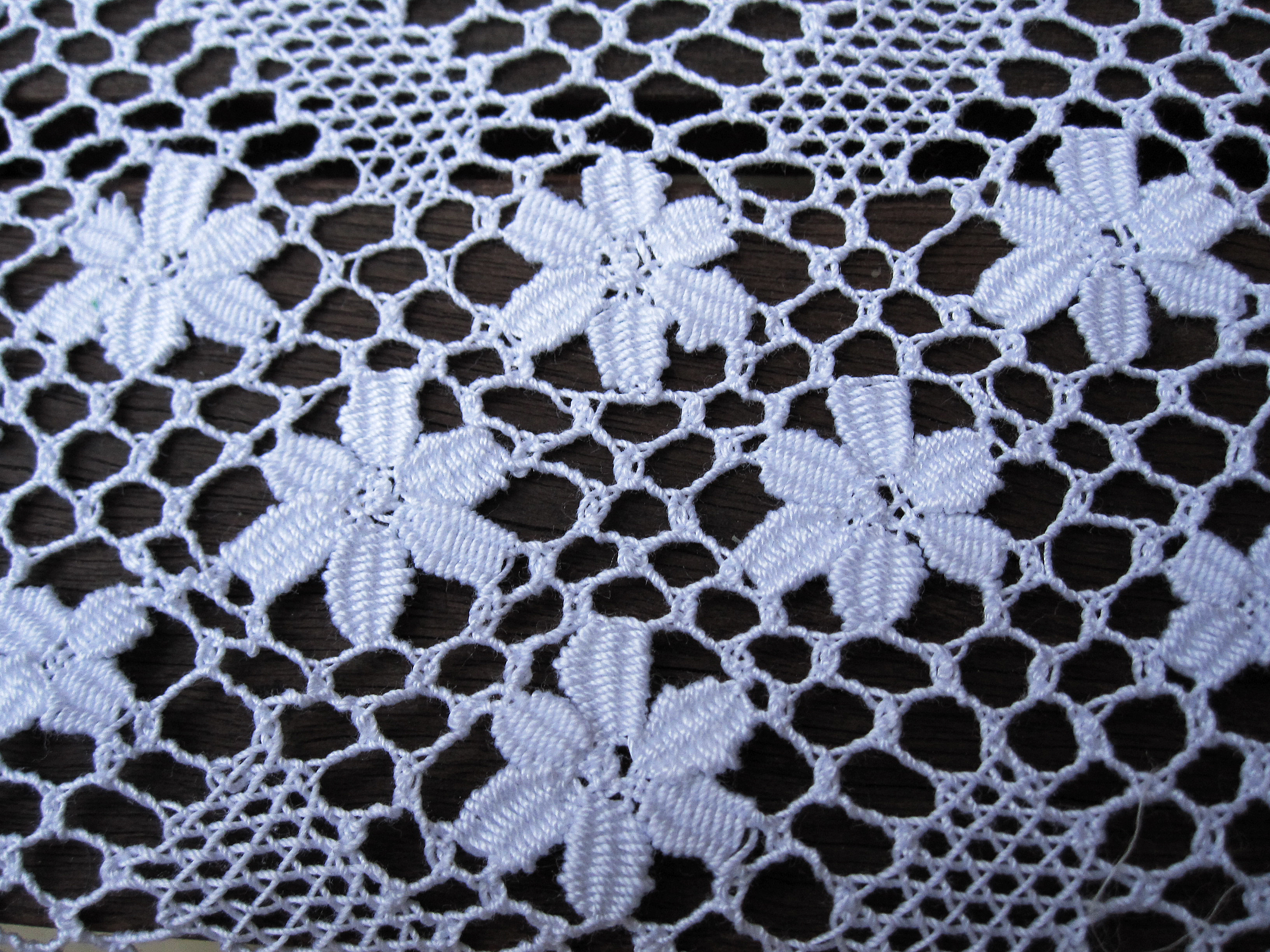
Mundillo de Moca

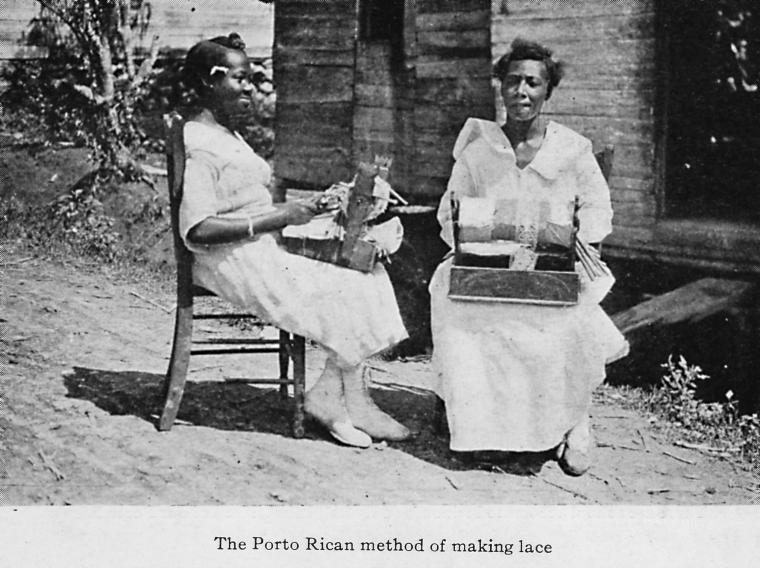
Women in Puerto Rico making Mundillo lace, 1920

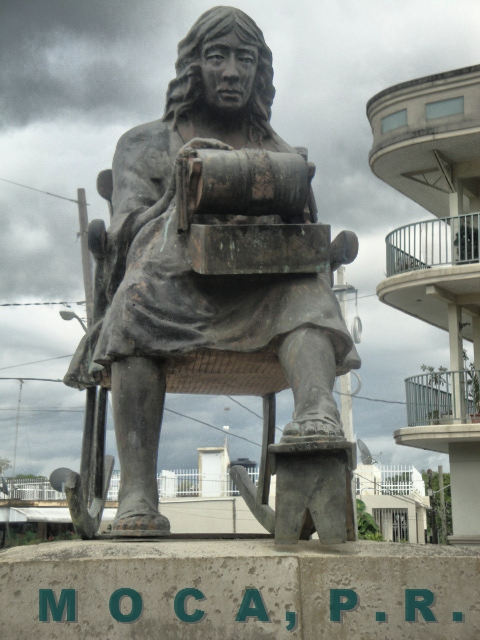
Monumento a la Tejedora, Moca, Puerto Rico

Mundillo is a craft of handmade bobbin lace that is cultivated and honored on the island of Puerto Rico and Panama.

== Description ==
The term 'mundillo' means 'little world', referring to the cylindrical pillow on which the lace maker ('Mundillista') weaves intricate designs. The decorative lace is created using wooden bobbins about the diameter of a pencil, which are wound with thread that is twisted and crossed to form a pattern. Depending on the pattern, as few as two dozen or as many as several hundred bobbins may be used.

In addition to its use as edging and borders on tablecloths and handkerchiefs, and for traditional shirt collars and trim, mundillo is also used to decorate items for special occasions, such as wedding dresses, baptismal gowns, and the cloths used to adorn religious icons. It is said that it was once common for lovers to exchange mundillo lace with romantic inscriptions.

Bobbin lace was brought to Puerto Rico from Spain, where it had thrived in major commercial markets as well as a cottage industry in Galicia, Castilla, and Catalonia. In Spain, lace is called encaje, because it was worked on separately and then joined to material (the Spanish word for "join" is encajar).

In the 20th century, lacemaking became an important economic activity by women of the island. Prior to WWII, lace provided income for many families to supplement the wages of men who had traveled off-island for work. A revival of the tradition in the 1960s and 1970s engaged a new generation of lacemakers. In the 1990s, it was reported that 300 people were practitioners of mundillo on the island of Puerto Rico.

In 2023, Rosa Elena Egipciaco was awarded a National Endowment for the Arts Fellowship for her work on preserving, designing, and teaching the lace tradition.

In Moca, commonly known as the Capital or cradle of Mundillo, there is an annual festival dedicated to the handmade lace as well as a museum, El Museo Del Mundillo.

A workshop with kits to help train newcomers to mundillo was offered in Morovis in 2018.

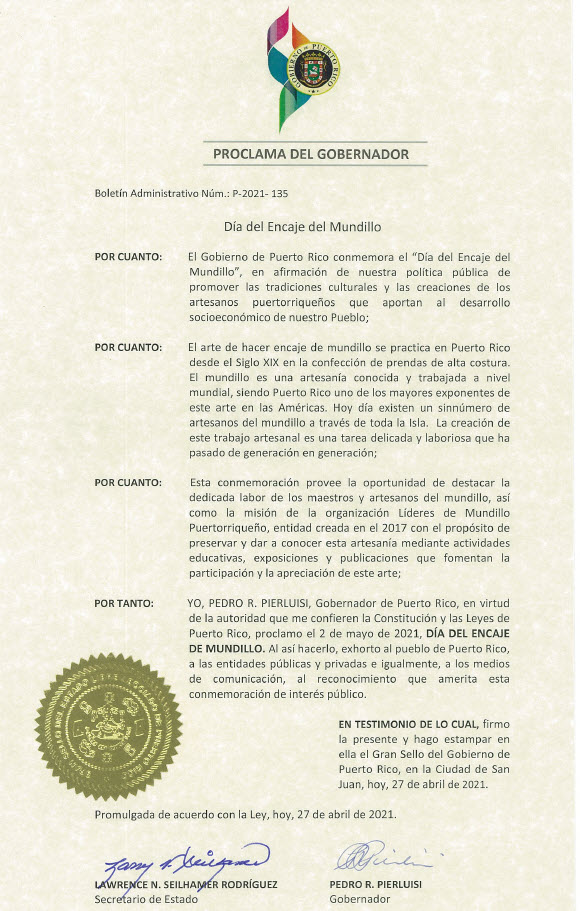
Official recognition of Mundillo Lace Day by the government of Puerto Rico

Mundillo is celebrated and featured in festivals around the island. In 2021, the government of the Commonwealth of Puerto Rico officially established an annual day to celebrate, preserve, and promote the heritage craft, on the first Sunday in May each year as “Día Nacional del Mundillo Puertorriqueño”.

In 2021, 95-year-old "mundillera" artisan Nellie Vera Sánchez was awarded a National Heritage Fellowship Award by the National Endowment for the Arts in honor of her work on this traditional craft.

Contemporary lacemakers can learn to reproduce the style of lace with historical techniques. An exhibition of the influence of this lace in fashion, and the importance of the tradition among generations of Puerto Rican diaspora, has been mounted.

== See also ==
- Bobbin lace
- Rosa Elena Egipciaco
- Puerto Rican Art
