= Marías, Moca, Puerto Rico =

Barrio of Puerto Rico

Marías
- Barrio
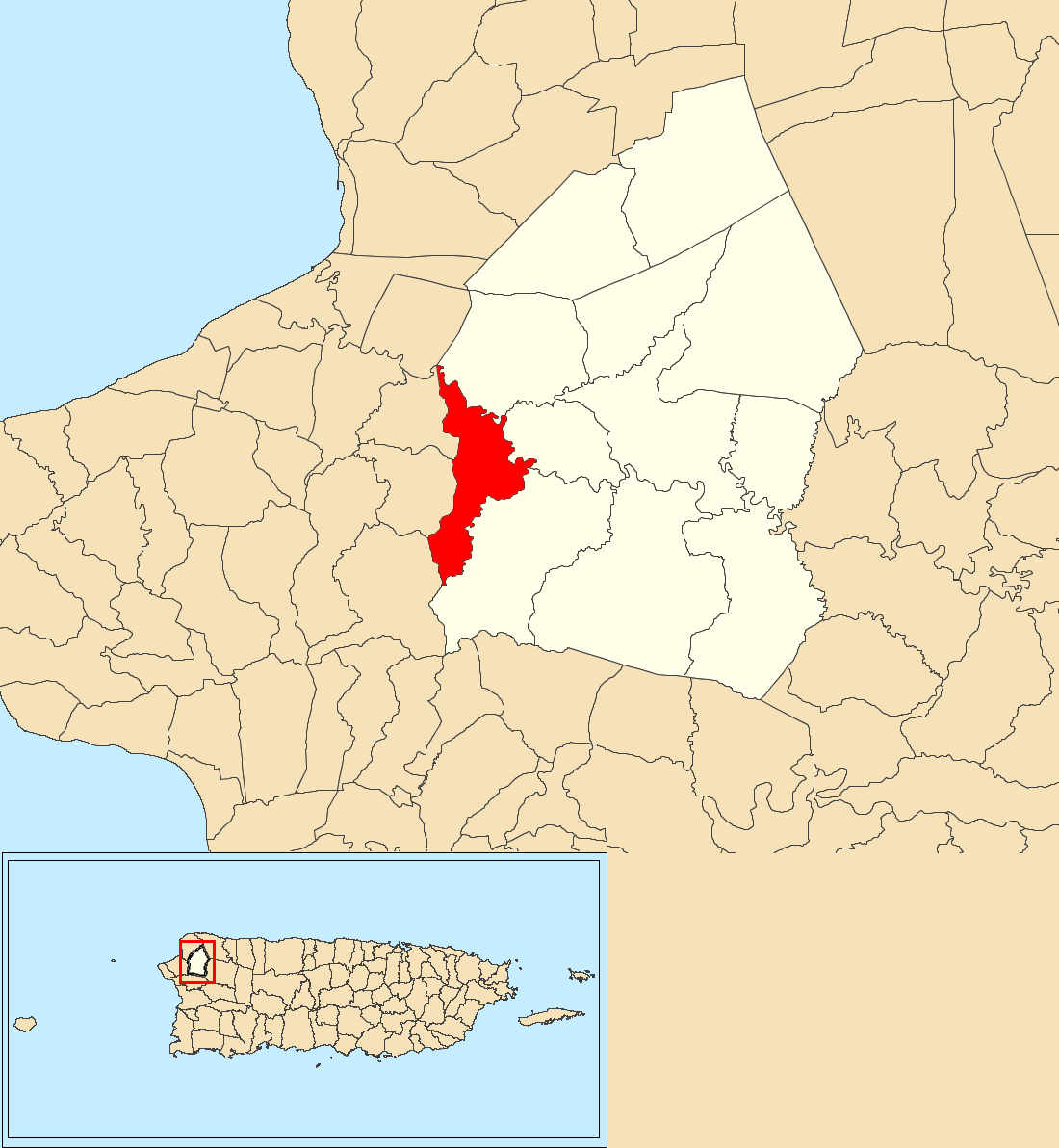
- Location of Marías within the municipality of Moca shown in red

- Location of Puerto Rico
- Coordinates: 18°21′38″N 67°07′18″W
- Commonwealth: Puerto Rico
- Municipality: Moca

Area
  - Total: 2.34 sq mi (6.1 km^{2})
  - Land: 2.33 sq mi (6.0 km^{2})
  - Water: 0.01 sq mi (0.026 km^{2})
- Elevation: 459 ft (140 m)

Population (2010)
  - Total: 1,766
  - Density: 757.9/sq mi (292.6/km^{2})
- Source: 2010 Census
- Time zone: UTC−4 (AST)

Marías is a barrio in the municipality of Moca, Puerto Rico. Its population in 2010 was 1,766.

== History ==
Marías was in Spain's gazetteers until Puerto Rico was ceded by Spain in the aftermath of the Spanish–American War under the terms of the Treaty of Paris of 1898 and became an unincorporated territory of the United States. In 1899, the United States Department of War conducted a census of Puerto Rico finding that the population of Marías barrio was 1,062.

Historical population
Census	Pop.	Note	%±
1900	1,062		—
1910	1,197		12.7%
1920	1,250		4.4%
1930	1,366		9.3%
1940	1,432		4.8%
1950	1,175		−17.9%
1960	1,115		−5.1%
1970	954		−14.4%
1980	1,250		31.0%
1990	1,461		16.9%
2000	1,932		32.2%
2010	1,766		−8.6%
U.S. Decennial Census; 1899 (shown as 1900) 1910-1930; 1930-1950 1960 1980-2000 2010

== Río Culebrinas flooding ==
In late May 2019, barrio Marías and multiple areas in various municipalities suffered flooding, felled trees, landslides and closed highways when Río Culebrinas flooded.

== See also ==
- List of communities in Puerto Rico
