= Gas chamber (disambiguation) =

Gas chamber may refer to a means of execution wherein a poisonous gas is introduced into a hermetically sealed chamber, to kill animals or humans.

Gas Chamber or Gas Chambers may also refer to:

== Compartments ==
=== Man-made ===
- A chamber used to maintain neutral buoyancy in life preservers and pontoons
- A recoil-reducing countermass mechanism in an automatic or semi-automatic rifle such as the AK-107

=== In nature ===
- The siphuncle or float chamber, found in the shells of some cephalopods
- Gas chambers, a fast, hollow and shallow point break type of wave

== Geography ==
- Gas Chambers, a surfing beach near Aguadilla, Puerto Rico
- Gas Chambers, a surfing beach on North Shore (Oahu) where Gas Chamber waves are found

== Music ==
- Gas Chamber (album), a 1993 album by American rapper C-Bo
- "Gas Chamber", a song by the Angry Samoans on the 1982 album, Back from Samoa also covered by the Foo Fighters
- "Gas Chambers", the former name of "All the Love" by Kanye West
