= Punta Borinquen Light =

Lighthouse in Aguadilla, Puerto Rico

Punta Borinquen Light Faro de Punta Borinquen
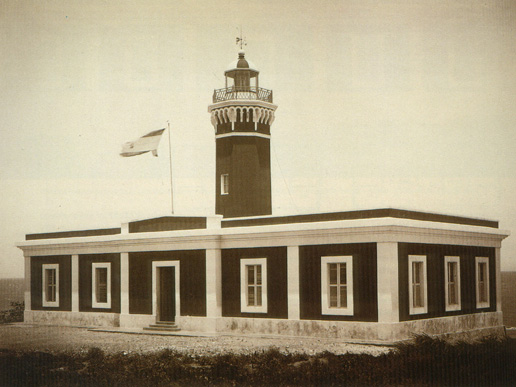
- Original Punta Borinquen Light, ca. 1898
- Location: Borinquen, Aguadilla, United States
- Coordinates: 18°29′19″N 67°09′42″W

Tower
- Constructed: 1889
- Construction: stone (tower), stone (foundation)
- Height: 18 m (59 ft)
- Shape: octagonal prism
- Heritage: National Register of Historic Places listed place

Light
- First lit: 15 September 1889
- Deactivated: 1918
- Lens: fourth order Fresnel lens
- Range: 24 nmi (44 km; 28 mi)
- 1922 light
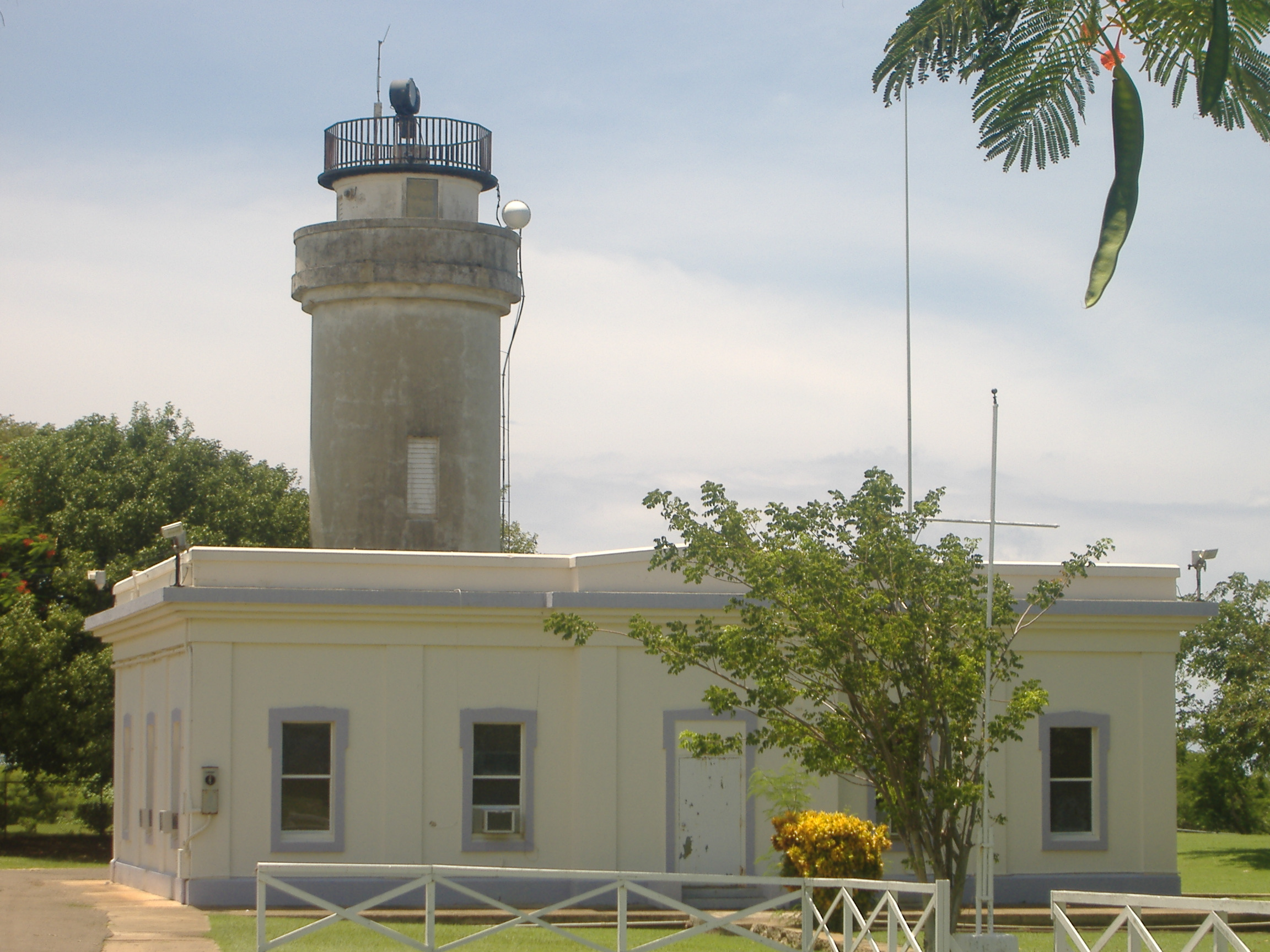
- Existing tower
- Coordinates: 18°29′50″N 67°08′56″W
- Constructed: 1922
- Automated: 1976
- Shape: cylinder
- First lit: 1922
- Focal height: 292 ft (89 m)
- Range: 14 nmi (26 km; 16 mi)
- Characteristic: Fl(2) W 15s
- Faro de Punta Borinquen
- U.S. National Register of Historic Places
- Puerto Rico Historic Sites and Zones
- MPS: Lighthouse System of Puerto Rico TR
- NRHP reference No.: 81000559
- Added to NRHP: 1981

Punta Borinquen Light (Faro de Punta Borinquen) is a historic lighthouse located in the municipality of Aguadilla on the northwestern corner, known as Punta Borinquen, of the main island of Puerto Rico. Situated on the grounds of the former Ramey Air Force Base, the station was established in 1889 by the Spanish government. With the opening of the Panama Canal in 1914, the lighthouse would become "the most important aid to navigation on the route from Europe to Panama". In 1917, the U.S. Congress provided funding for a new lighthouse in higher ground.

But before construction began on the new structure, the original lighthouse was severely damaged by the 1918 earthquake that struck the west part of the island. Construction on the new lighthouse was completed in 1922. The light is active aid to navigation and is an MWR housing facility for the United States Coast Guard.

== See also ==
- List of lighthouses in Puerto Rico
