= Guerrero Correctional Institution =

Men's prison located in Aguadilla, Puerto Rico

Coordinates: 18°28′11″N 67°04′01″W

- Interactive map of Guerrero Correctional Institution
- Location: Carr. #2 Int. 466 Bo. Guerrero Aguadilla, Puerto Rico
- Status: open
- Security class: minimum, medium
- Capacity: 944
- Opened: 1986
- Managed by: Puerto Rico Department of Corrections and Rehabilitation

The Guerrero Correctional Institution (Institución Correccional Guerrero) is a prison for men located in Aguadilla, Puerto Rico, owned and operated by the Puerto Rico Department of Corrections and Rehabilitation. With a stated capacity of 944 inmates, it's among the three largest prisons in the territory.

The facility was first opened in 1986 as a Community Therapy mental health unit (Comunidad Terapéutica de Guerrero) of the Puerto Rico Department of Health. It became a correctional facility in March 1997. As of 2008 about a third of its inmates were pre-trial detainees, and the others were serving longer sentences at minimum security.

From 2002 to 2008, some 53 Guerrero inmates died inside the institution, all but one of them pre-trial detainees, and 73% of them within their first week behind bars, most of them homeless. An extensive report by the ACLU of Puerto Rico blamed the abuse of a horse tranquilizer, Xylazine, among inmates, and lack of appropriate medical attention and lack of accountability among prison officials.
