= Guerrero, Aguadilla, Puerto Rico =

Barrio of Puerto Rico

Guerrero
- Barrio
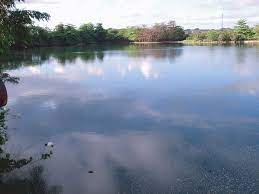
- Lago Guerrero

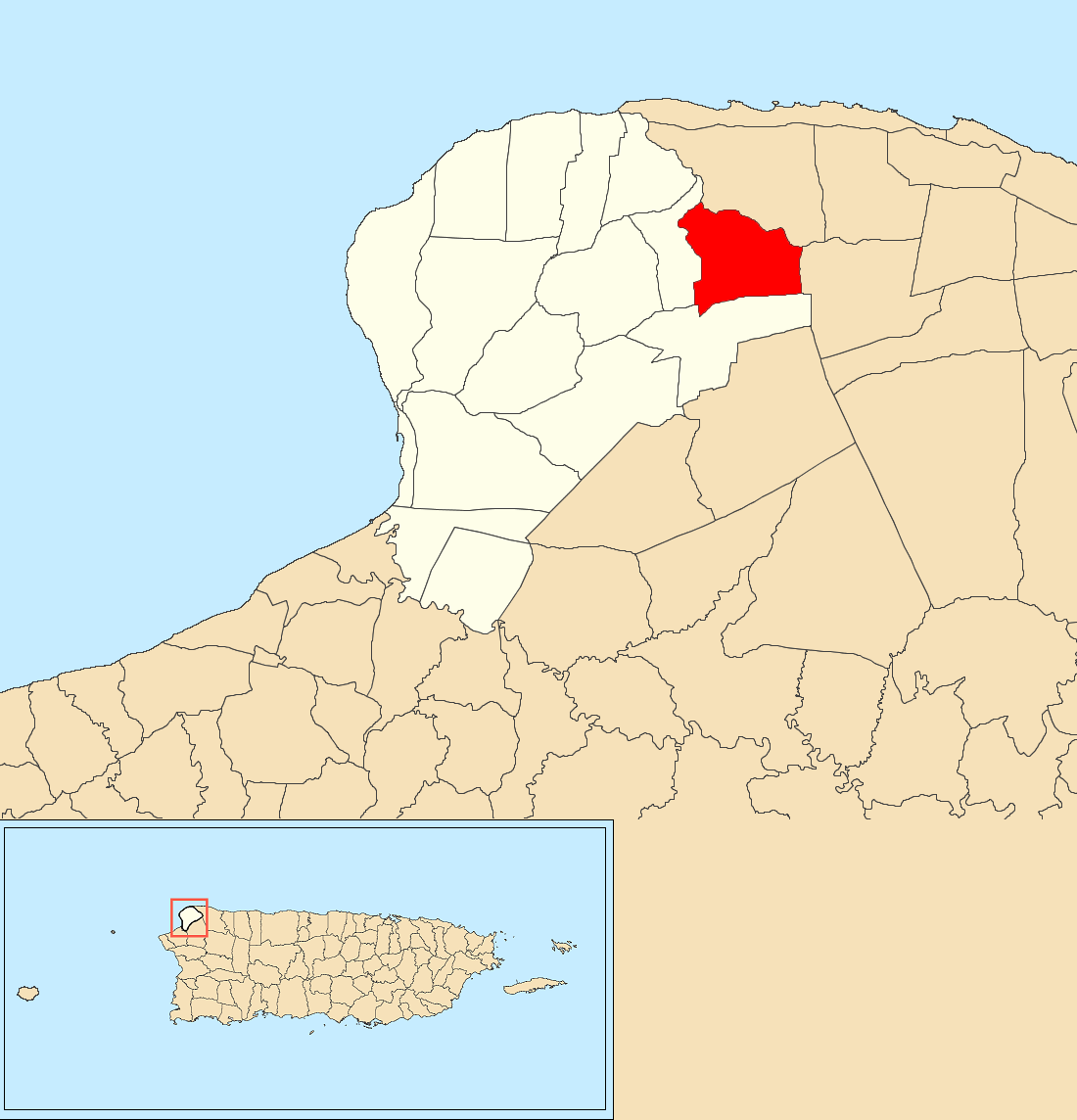

- Location of Puerto Rico
- Coordinates: 18°28′55″N 67°04′23″W
- Commonwealth: Puerto Rico
- Municipality: Aguadilla

Area
  - Total: 2.25 sq mi (5.8 km^{2})
  - Land: 2.23 sq mi (5.8 km^{2})
  - Water: 0.02 sq mi (0.052 km^{2})
- Elevation: 348 ft (106 m)

Population (2010)
  - Total: 3,406
  - Density: 1,527.4/sq mi (589.7/km^{2})
- Source: 2010 Census
- Time zone: UTC−4 (AST)

Guerrero is a rural barrio in the municipality of Aguadilla, Puerto Rico. Its population in 2010 was 3,406. In Guerrero barrio is Rafael Hernández, a comunidad.

== History ==
Guerrero was in Spain's gazetteers until Puerto Rico was ceded by Spain in the aftermath of the Spanish–American War under the terms of the Treaty of Paris of 1898 and became an unincorporated territory of the United States. In 1899, the United States Department of War conducted a census of Puerto Rico finding that the population of Guerrero barrio was 638.

== Features ==
The Guerrero Correctional Institution, one of the largest men's prisons in Puerto Rico, is located in Guerrero.

Lago Guerrero (Guerrero Lake) is a 32,000-square-meter reservoir located in Guerrero. Built in the 1930s, it is fed by the Guajataca Lake.

Historical population
Census	Pop.	Note	%±
1900	638		—
1910	700		9.7%
1920	808		15.4%
1930	791		−2.1%
1940	1,022		29.2%
1950	2,026		98.2%
1960	934		−53.9%
1970	1,076		15.2%
1980	1,822		69.3%
1990	2,454		34.7%
2000	3,366		37.2%
2010	3,406		1.2%
U.S. Decennial Census; 1899 (shown as 1900) 1910-1930; 1930-1950 1980-2000 2010

== Sectors ==
Barrios (which are, in contemporary times, roughly comparable to minor civil divisions) in turn are further subdivided into smaller local populated place areas/units called sectores (sectors in English). The types of sectores may vary, from normally sector to urbanización to reparto to barriada to residencial, among others.

The following sectors are in Guerrero barrio:

Comunidad Rafael Hernández, Reparto La Ceiba, Sector La Paloma, Sector Muñiz, Urbanización Jardines Guerrero, and Urbanización Praderas de la Ceiba.

== See also ==
- List of communities in Puerto Rico
- List of barrios and sectors of Aguadilla, Puerto Rico
