= Palmar, Aguadilla, Puerto Rico =

Barrio of Puerto Rico

Palmar
- Barrio
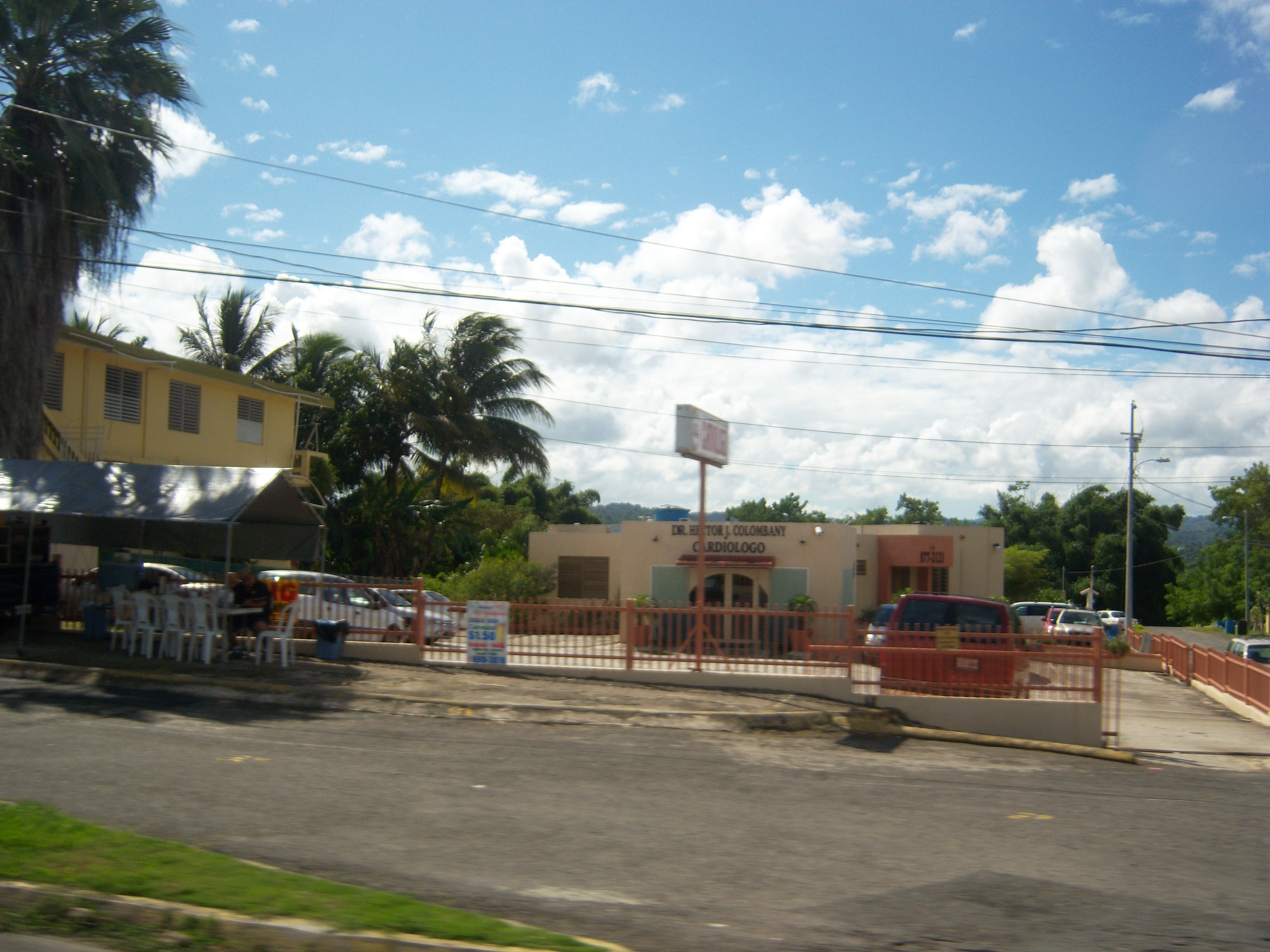
- Street and buildings in Palmar

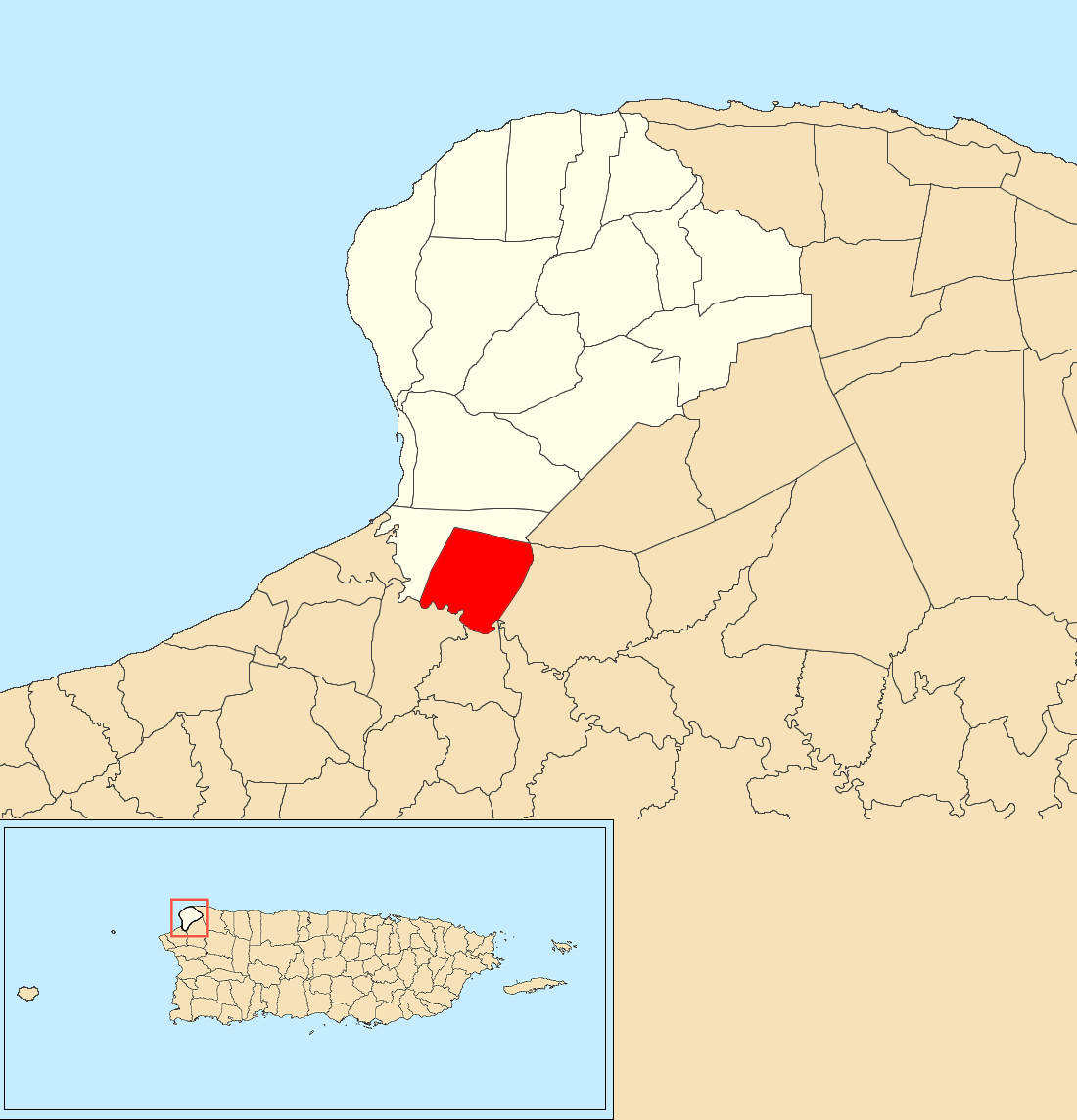

- Location of Puerto Rico
- Coordinates: 18°23′54″N 67°08′19″W
- Commonwealth: Puerto Rico
- Municipality: Aguadilla

Area
  - Total: 1.97 sq mi (5.1 km^{2})
  - Land: 1.96 sq mi (5.1 km^{2})
  - Water: 0.01 sq mi (0.026 km^{2})
- Elevation: 36 ft (11 m)

Population (2010)
  - Total: 1,743
  - Density: 889.3/sq mi (343.4/km^{2})
- Source: 2010 Census
- Time zone: UTC−4 (AST)

Palmar is a rural barrio in the municipality of Aguadilla, Puerto Rico. Its population in 2010 was 1,743.

== History ==
Palmar was in Spain's gazetteers until Puerto Rico was ceded by Spain in the aftermath of the Spanish–American War under the terms of the Treaty of Paris of 1898 and became an unincorporated territory of the United States. In 1899, the United States Department of War conducted a census of Puerto Rico finding that the population of Palmar barrio was 700.

Historical population
| Census | Pop. | Note | %± |
|---|---|---|---|
| 1900 | 700 | | — |
| 1910 | 831 | | 18.7% |
| 1920 | 1,016 | | 22.3% |
| 1930 | 938 | | −7.7% |
| 1940 | 1,394 | | 48.6% |
| 1950 | 1,461 | | 4.8% |
| 1960 | 1,196 | | −18.1% |
| 1970 | 1,542 | | 28.9% |
| 1980 | 1,693 | | 9.8% |
| 1990 | 1,928 | | 13.9% |
| 2000 | 2,136 | | 10.8% |
| 2010 | 1,743 | | −18.4% |
U.S. Decennial Census; 1899 (shown as 1900) 1910-1930; 1930-1950 1980-2000 2010

== Sectors ==
Barrios (which are, in contemporary times, roughly comparable to minor civil divisions) in turn are further subdivided into smaller local populated place areas/units called sectores (sectors in English). The types of sectores may vary, from normally sector to urbanización to reparto to barriada to residencial, among others.

The following sectors are in Palmar barrio:

Camino Bosque, Camino Cordero, Camino Ismael Torres, Camino Rivera, Comunidad Palmar, Reparto Sara, Sector Arocho, Sector Corea, Sector Fuentes, Sector Los Torres, Sector Polo Medina, Sector Viñet, and Urbanización Cortez.

== See also ==
- List of communities in Puerto Rico
- List of barrios and sectors of Aguadilla, Puerto Rico
