= Aguadilla Divas =

Former female professional volleyball team from Aguadilla, Puerto Rico

Aguadilla Divas is a defunct female professional volleyball team that was part of the Female Superior Volleyball League and played in Aguadilla, Puerto Rico, until January 4, 2006. Its home arena was Luis T. Diaz Coliseum. Willie Lopez ran the team, with practices held in nearby Moca at the Juan Sanchez Acevedo Coliseum.

The record for their first season (2006) was 1-21. In 2007, their record was 4–17.
