= Luis T. Diaz Coliseum =

Arena in Aguadilla, Puerto Rico

Luis T. Diaz Coliseum Coliseo Luis T. Diaz
- Interactive map of Luis T. Diaz Coliseum; Coliseo Luis T. Diaz
- Location: Marina Street; Aguadilla, PR 00604
- Coordinates: 18°25′34″N 067°09′19″W
- Owner: City of Aguadilla
- Operator: City of Aguadilla
- Capacity: 2,500+

Construction
- Opened: 1971
- Renovated: 2005
- Closed: 2017

Tenants
- Aguadilla Sharks (BSN) (1980s-1998); Aguadilla Divas (FSVL) (2006-2008)

Luis T. Diaz Coliseum (Spanish: Coliseo Luis T. Diaz) was the main arena in Aguadilla, Puerto Rico. It is located on Marina Street facing the Atlantic Ocean. Currently seats 2,500+ for basketball & volleyball games and it is the former home of the Las Divas de Aguadilla of the Female Superior Volleyball League. Named after Luis T. Diaz who taught sports to the youth of the city. Formerly home to the Aguadilla Sharks of the National Superior Basketball League as well.

== History ==
The Coliseum opened to the public in 1971 as the main arena in the city hosting many events like Basketball games, Volleyball games, Pro Wrestling events, and Church Gatherings among others.

In the lobby, there was a plaque of Luis T. Diaz and in a room showing a lot of trophies from various sports and a picture of the 2006 Aguadilla Divas.

The Coliseum was renovated in 2005 when the city learned that the Divas were coming to play in the building. Also the Coliseum hosts city activities, Pro Wrestling events from both IWA, Caribbean Pro Wrestling, and the WWC, Elementary, Middle & High School Graduation Celebrations.

After Hurricane Maria in 2017, the coliseum remained closed and abandoned.
