= Maleza Baja, Aguadilla, Puerto Rico =

Barrio of Puerto Rico

Maleza Baja
- Barrio
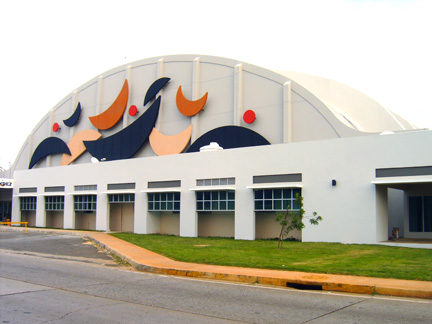
- Rafael Hernández Airport

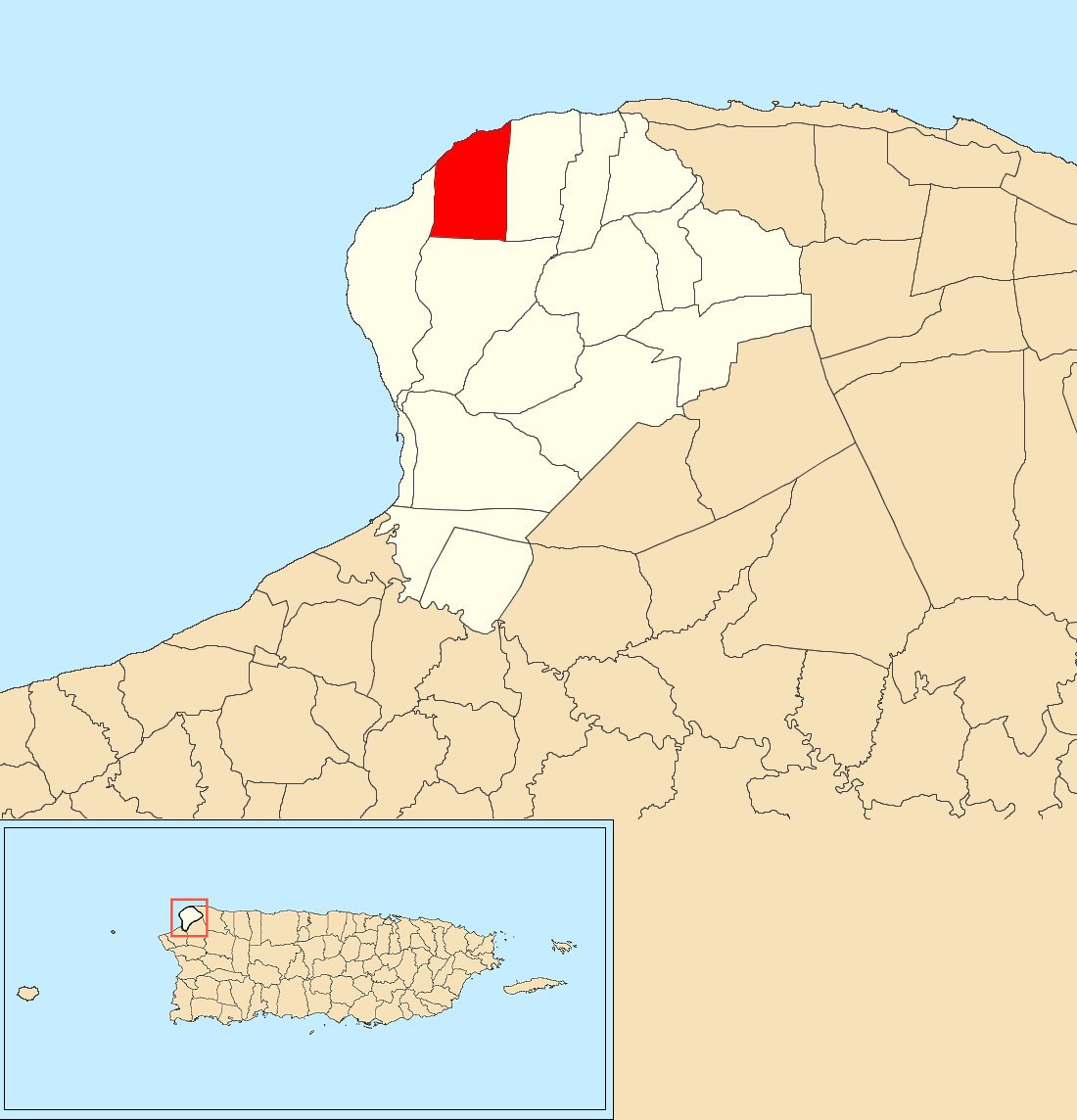

- Location of Puerto Rico
- Coordinates: 18°29′48″N 67°08′17″W
- Commonwealth: Puerto Rico
- Municipality: Aguadilla

Area
  - Total: 2.28 sq mi (5.9 km^{2})
  - Land: 1.97 sq mi (5.1 km^{2})
  - Water: 0.31 sq mi (0.80 km^{2})
- Elevation: 217 ft (66 m)

Population (2010)
  - Total: 1,887
  - Density: 957.9/sq mi (369.8/km^{2})
- Source: 2010 Census
- Time zone: UTC−4 (AST)

Maleza Baja is a rural barrio in the municipality of Aguadilla, Puerto Rico. Its population in 2010 was 1,887.

== History ==
Maleza Baja was in Spain's gazetteers until Puerto Rico was ceded by Spain in the aftermath of the Spanish–American War under the terms of the Treaty of Paris of 1898 and became an unincorporated territory of the United States. In 1899, the United States Department of War conducted a census of Puerto Rico finding that the population of Maleza Baja barrio was 905.

Historical population
| Census | Pop. | Note | %± |
|---|---|---|---|
| 1900 | 905 | | — |
| 1910 | 1,111 | | 22.8% |
| 1920 | 1,250 | | 12.5% |
| 1930 | 1,448 | | 15.8% |
| 1940 | 297 | | −79.5% |
| 1950 | 385 | | 29.6% |
| 1960 | 2,628 | | 582.6% |
| 1970 | 3,470 | | 32.0% |
| 1980 | 284 | | −91.8% |
| 1990 | 2,978 | | 948.6% |
| 2000 | 3,058 | | 2.7% |
| 2010 | 1,887 | | −38.3% |
U.S. Decennial Census; 1899 (shown as 1900) 1910-1930; 1930-1950 1980-2000 2010

== Sectors ==
Barrios (which are, in contemporary times, roughly comparable to minor civil divisions) in turn are further subdivided into smaller local populated place areas/units called sectores (sectors in English). The types of sectores may vary, from normally sector to urbanización to reparto to barriada to residencial, among others.

The following sectors are in Maleza Baja barrio:

Base Ramey, Sector Las Villas, Sector Martinica, Sector Vista Ramey, Urbanización Base Ramey, and Urbanización Las Villas Light House.

== See also ==
- List of communities in Puerto Rico
- List of barrios and sectors of Aguadilla, Puerto Rico
