= Borinquen, Aguadilla, Puerto Rico =

Barrio of Puerto Rico

Borinquen
- Barrio
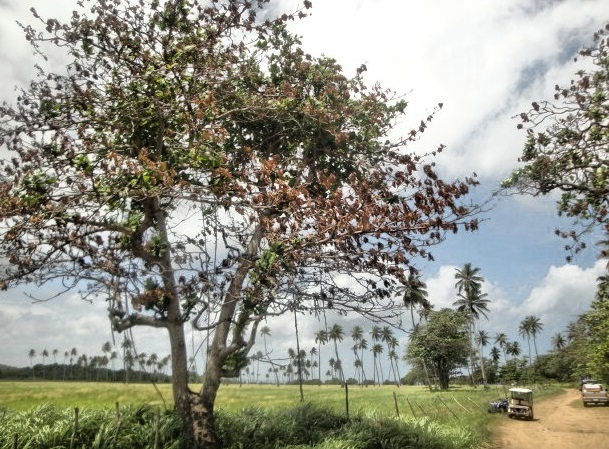
- Area of La Poza de Pachy in Playuela, a sector and beach in Borinquen

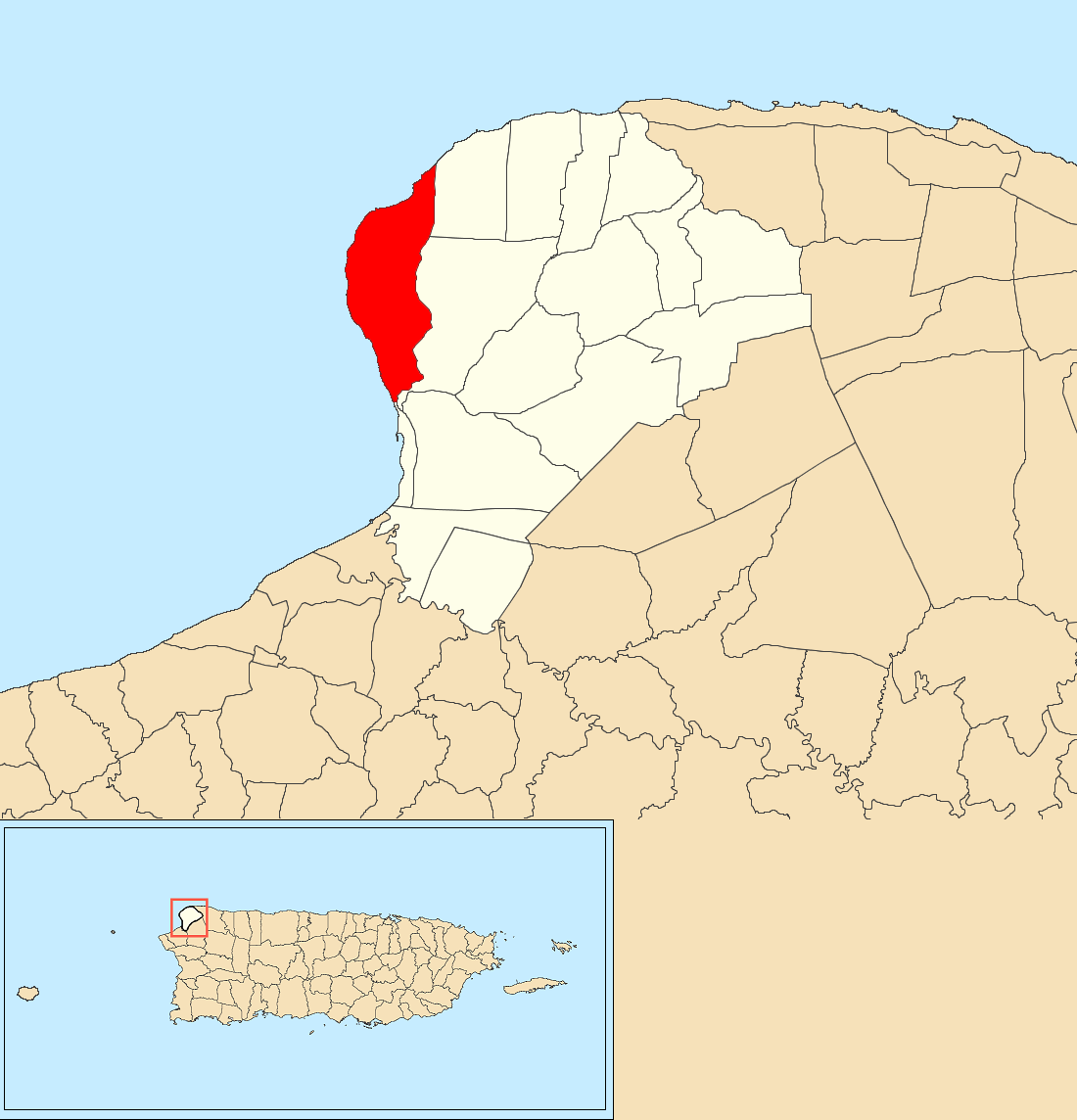

- Location of Puerto Rico
- Coordinates: 18°28′20″N 67°09′40″W
- Commonwealth: Puerto Rico
- Municipality: Aguadilla

Area
  - Total: 4.57 sq mi (11.8 km^{2})
  - Land: 3.33 sq mi (8.6 km^{2})
  - Water: 1.24 sq mi (3.2 km^{2})
- Elevation: 66 ft (20 m)

Population (2010)
  - Total: 7,415
  - Density: 2,233.4/sq mi (862.3/km^{2})
- Source: 2010 Census
- Time zone: UTC−4 (AST)

Borinquen is a barrio in the municipality of Aguadilla, Puerto Rico. Its population in 2010 was 7,415.

== History ==
Borinquen was in Spain's gazetteers until Puerto Rico was ceded by Spain in the aftermath of the Spanish–American War under the terms of the Treaty of Paris of 1898 and became an unincorporated territory of the United States. In 1899, the United States Department of War conducted a census of Puerto Rico finding that the population of Borinquen barrio was 1,271.

Historical population
Census	Pop.	Note	%±
1900	1,271		—
1940	2,501		—
1950	3,586		43.4%
1960	3,771		5.2%
1970	0		−100.0%
1980	9,031		—
1990	8,072		−10.6%
2000	8,386		3.9%
2010	7,415		−11.6%
U.S. Decennial Census; 1899 (shown as 1900) 1910-1930; 1930-1950 1980-2000 2010

== Geography ==
Playuela Beach in Borinquen is a beach with 4,000 feet (1,200 m) of coastline. A project to build hotels at Playuela Beach was in the works in 2017.

== Sectors ==
Barrios (which are, in contemporary times, roughly comparable to minor civil divisions) in turn are further subdivided into smaller local populated place areas/units called sectores (sectors in English). The types of sectores may vary, from normally sector to urbanización to reparto to barriada to residencial, among others.

The following sectors are in Borinquen barrio:

Apartamentos Sea View, Avenida Montemar, Comunidad Borinquen (Parcelas Nuevas), Condominio Puerta del Mar, Extensión Villa Marbella, Jardines de Borinquen, Reparto El Faro, Reparto Ramos, Reparto Solá, Reparto Tres Palmas, Residencial Público Agustín Stahl, Sandford, Sector Crash Boat, Sector El Chapey, Sector El Cobo, Sector El Cuco, Sector El Faro, Sector El Macetazo, Sector El Saco, Sector Jobos, Sector Las Dos Curvas, Sector Nino Valentín, Sector Playa India, Sector Playuela, Sector Rovira, Urbanización Bella Flores, Urbanización Borinquen, Urbanización Costa del Mar, Urbanización Costa del Sol, Urbanización El Verde, Urbanización Flamboyán, Urbanización Laderas del Mar, Urbanización Las Américas, Urbanización Las Casitas, Urbanización Las Mansiones, Urbanización Marbella, Urbanización Monte Verde, Urbanización Parque Los Caobos, Urbanización Villa Blanca, Urbanización Villa Haydeé, Urbanización Villa Krystal, Urbanización Villa Matías, Urbanización Villa Ruth, Villa Águeda, Villa Betania, Villa de Palma Real, Villa Lydia, Villa Marta, and Vista Alegre.

== Gallery ==
Scenes in Borinquen:

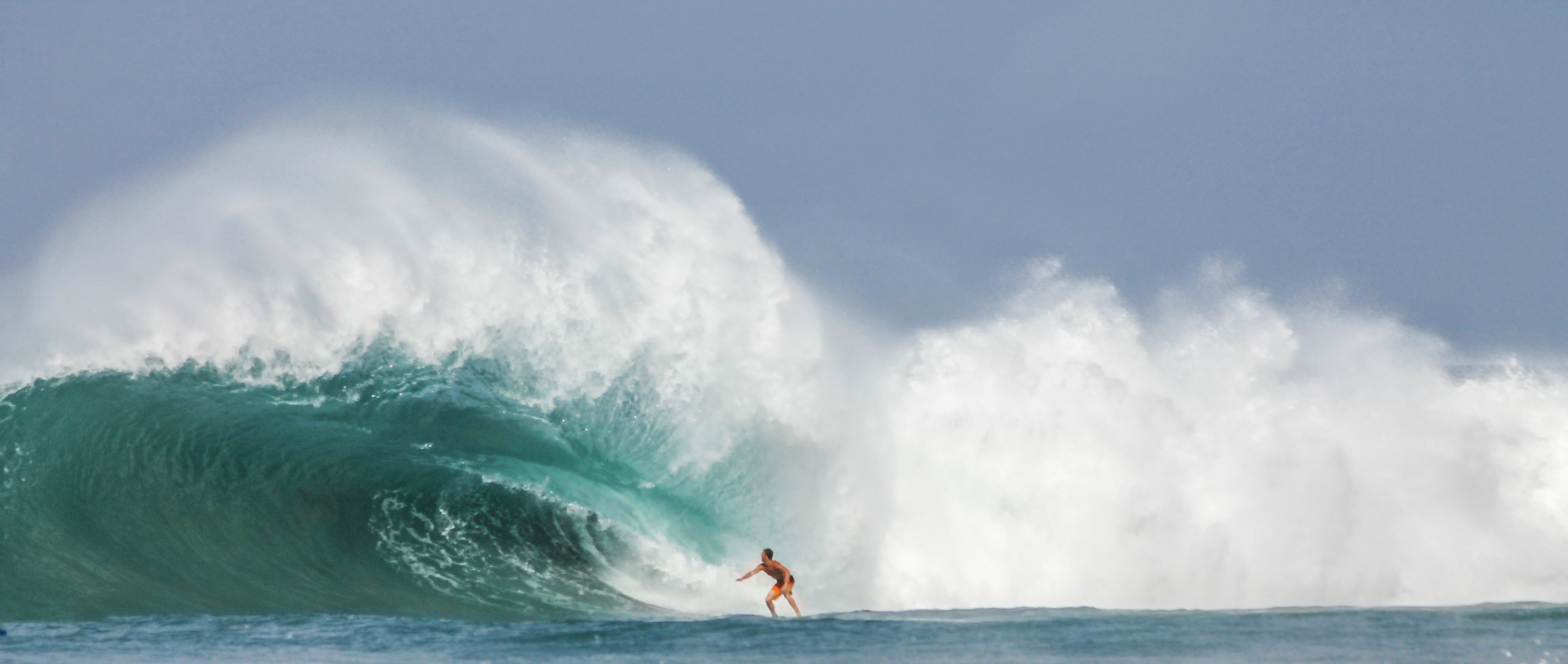
Nathan Mitchell and a wave at Gas Chambers Beach

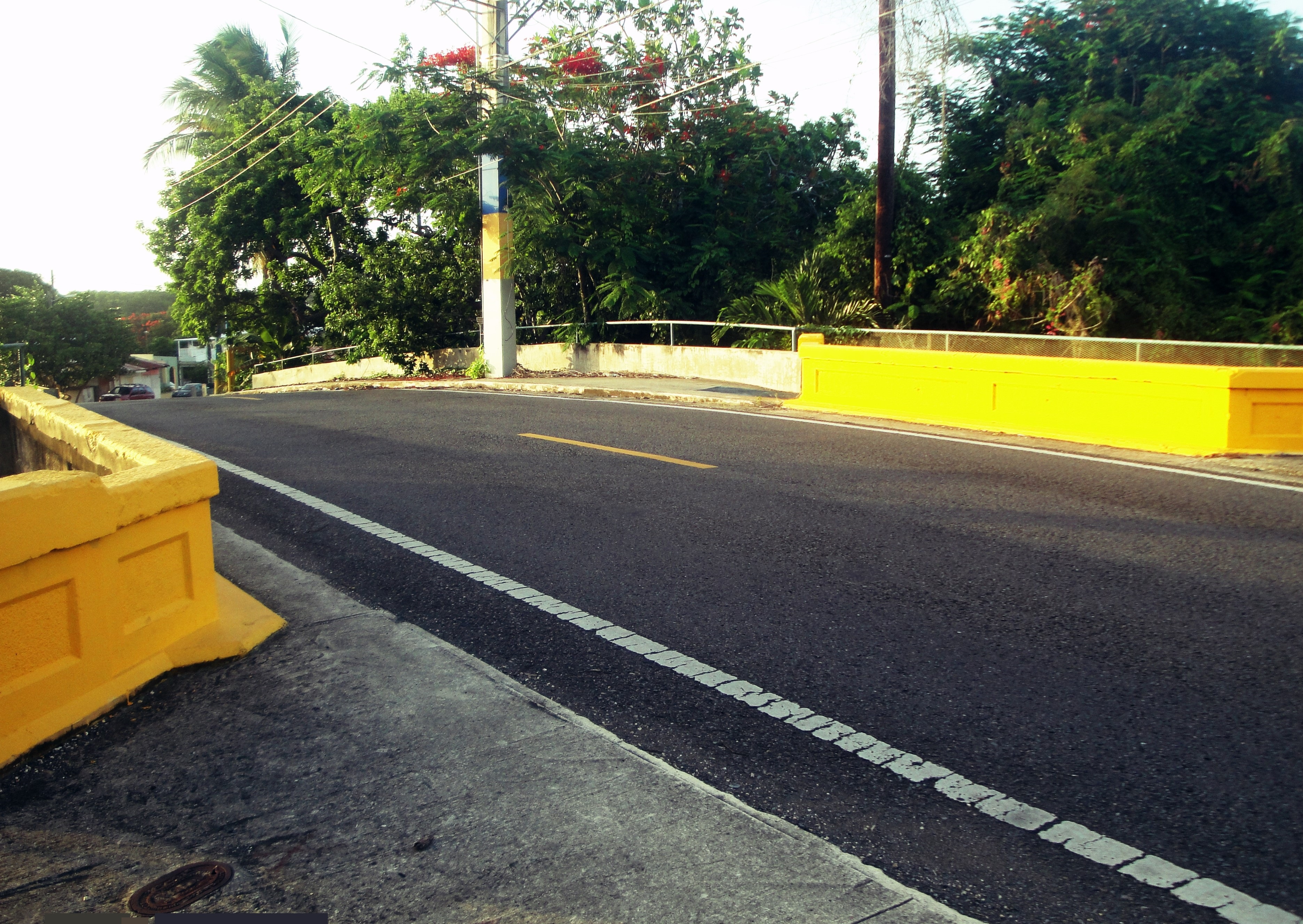
Puente del Chapey

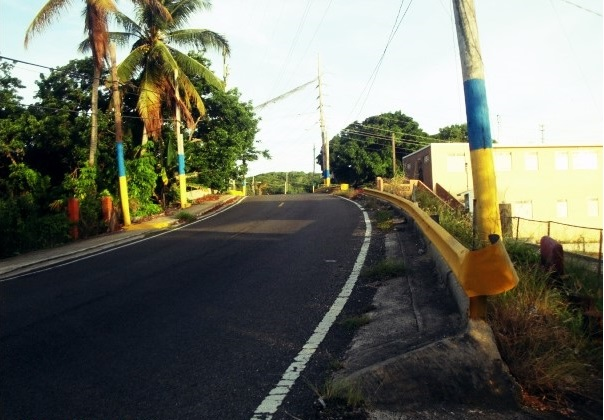
Puente del Chapey

== See also ==
- List of communities in Puerto Rico
- List of barrios and sectors of Aguadilla, Puerto Rico
- Rail transport in Puerto Rico
