= Aguadilla, Puerto Rico =

City and municipality in Puerto Rico

Aguadilla San Carlos de la Aguadilla
- Municipality
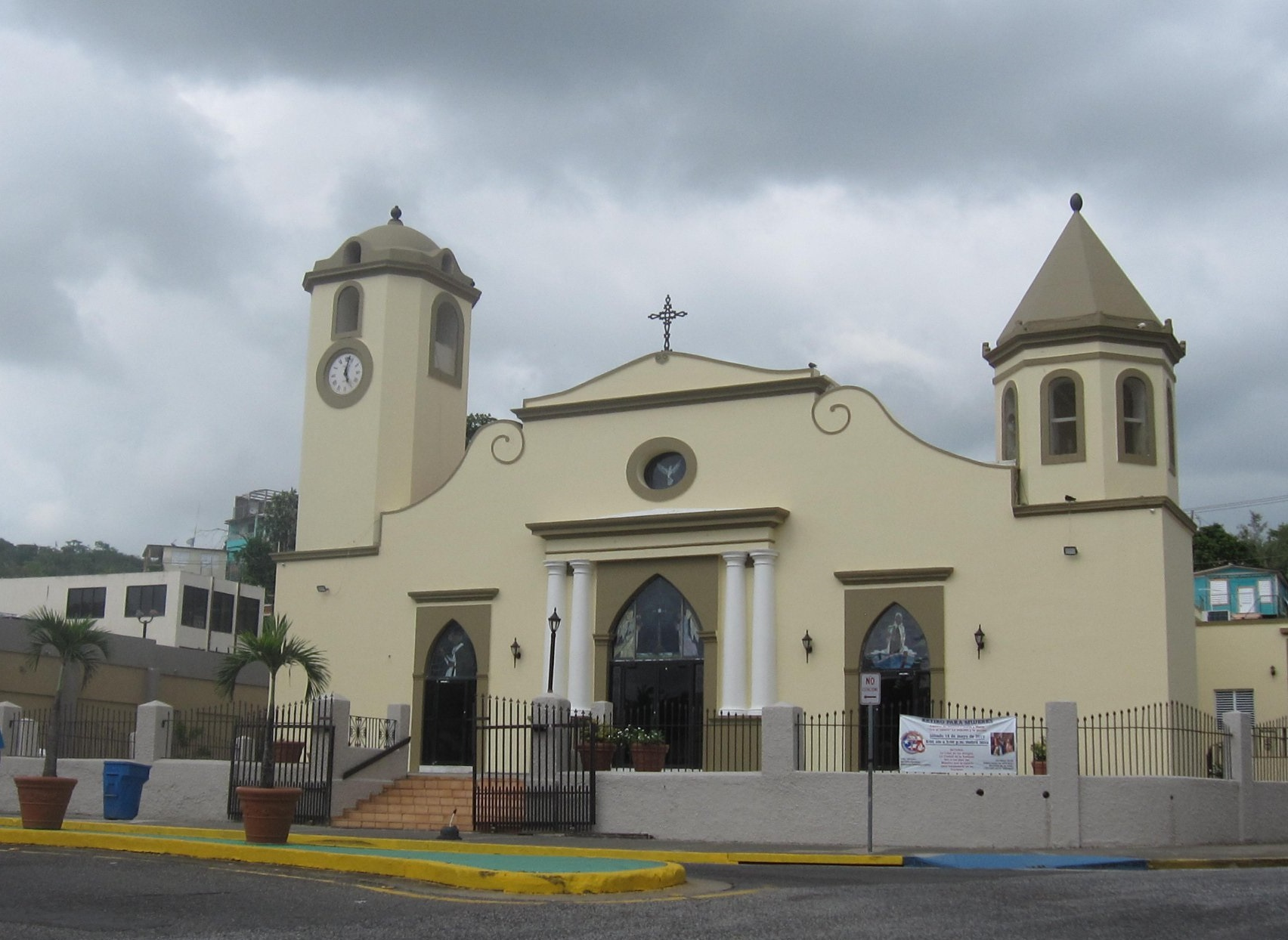
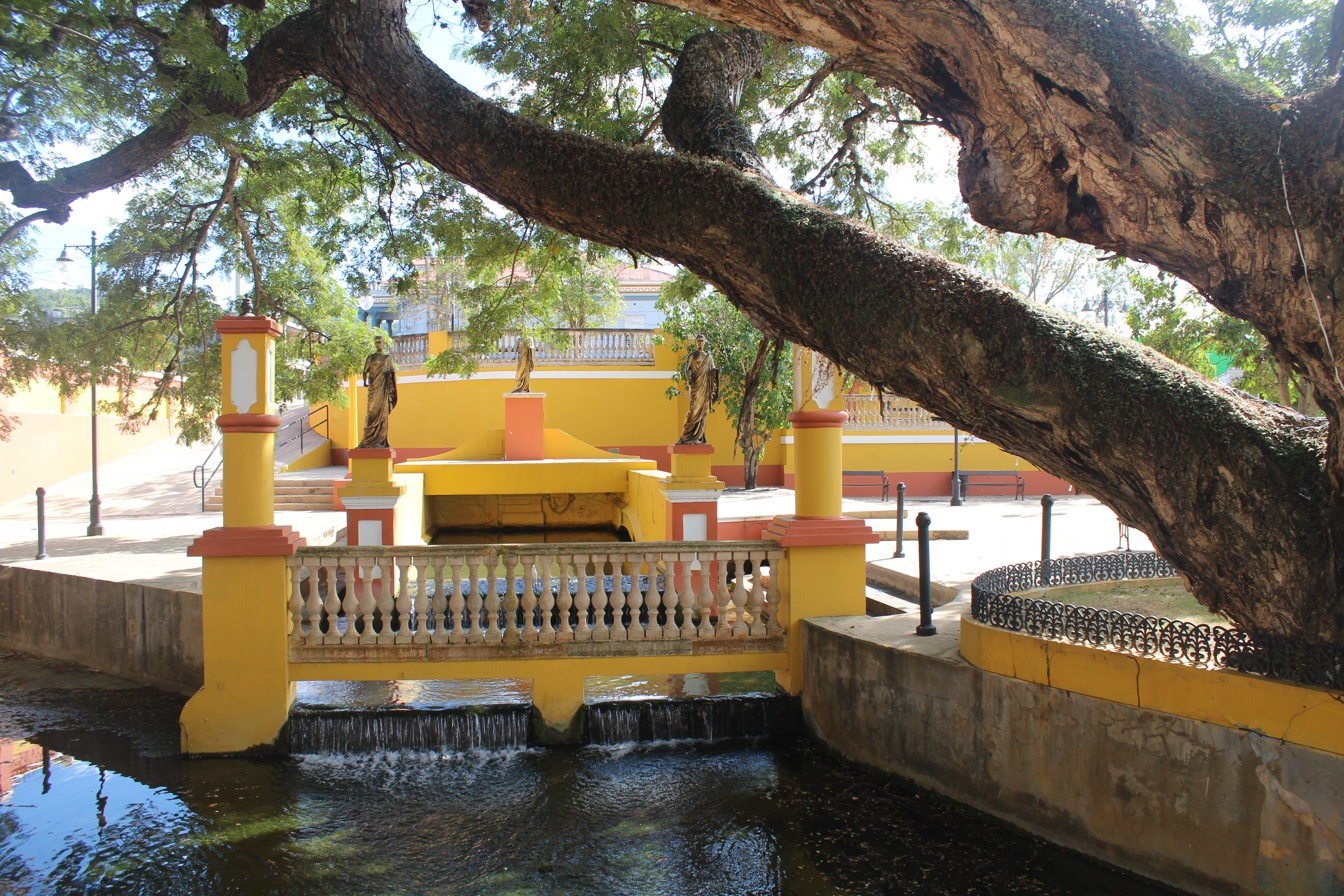
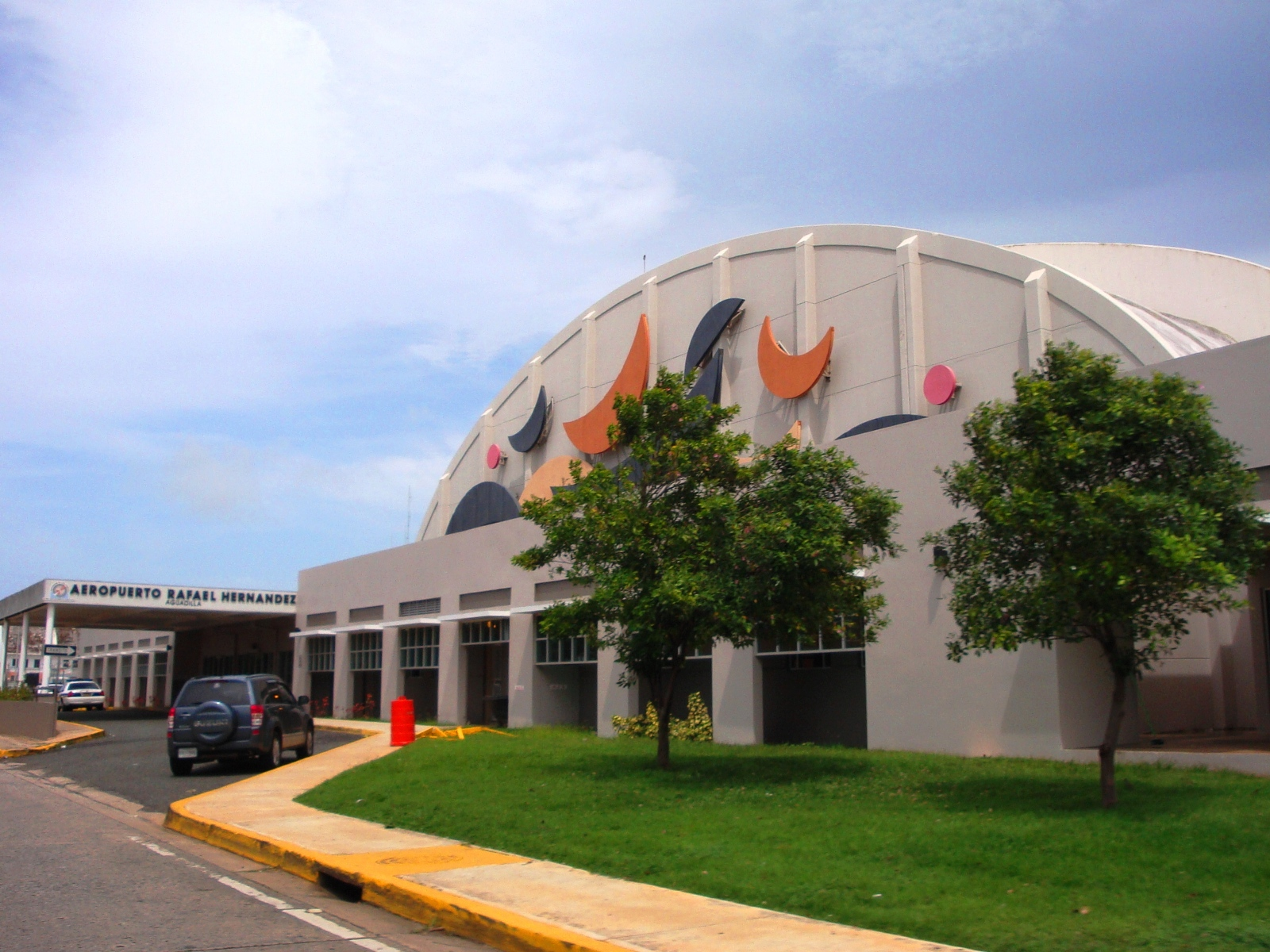
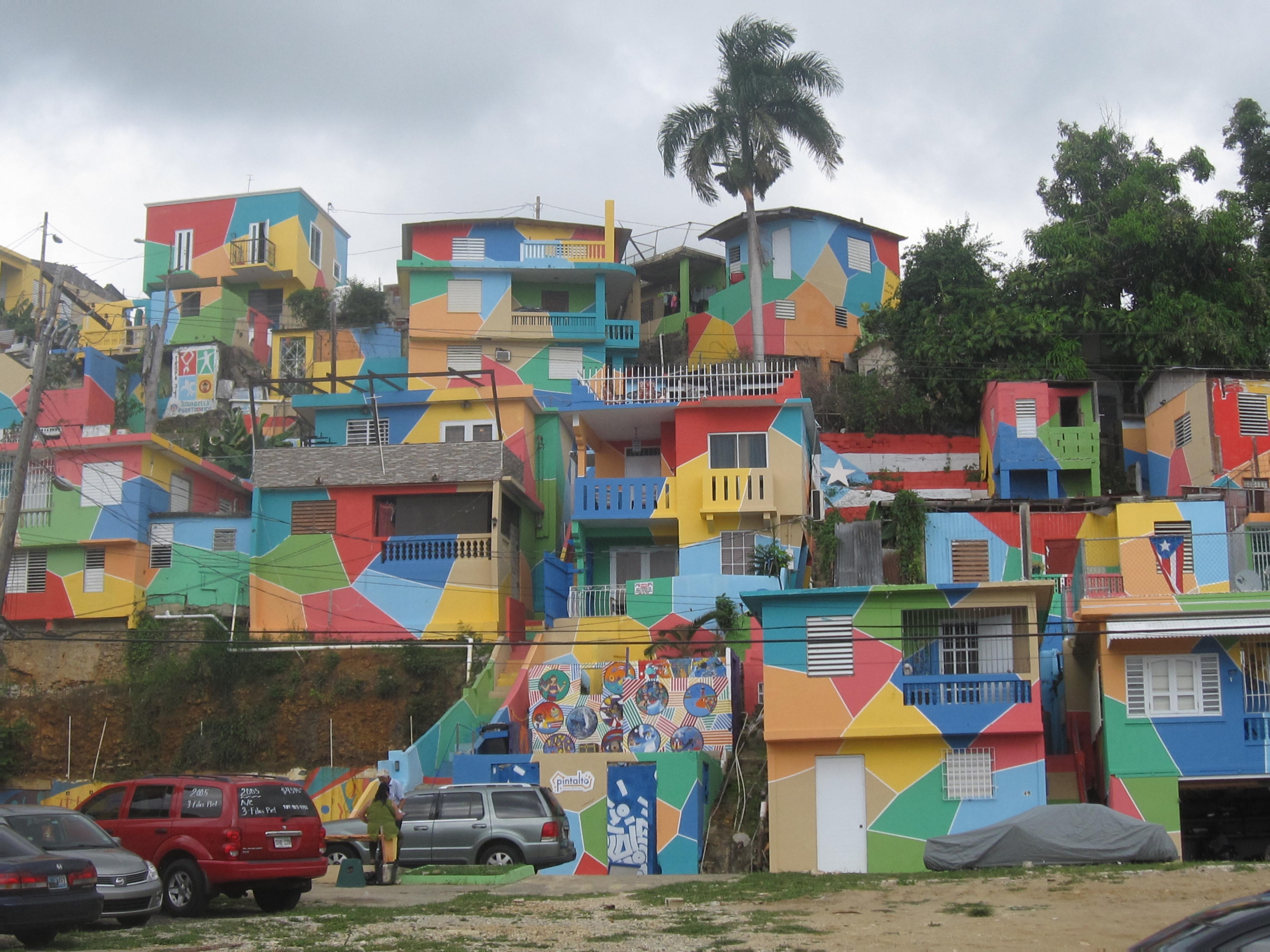
- Aguadilla; City Hall Church of Saint Charles Borromeo Promenade Ojo de Agua spring BQN Airport Houses of Colors Crash Boat Beach Borinquen Point

- Flag Coat of arms
- Nicknames: Jardín del Atlántico, La Villa del Ojo de Agua, El Pueblo de los Tiburones
- Anthem: Playita Aguadillana
- Map of Puerto Rico highlighting Aguadilla Municipality
- Coordinates: 18°25′48″N 67°9′16″W
- Sovereign state: United States
- Commonwealth: Puerto Rico
- First settled: 16th century
- Founded: July 6, 1775
- Founder: Luis de Córdova
- Barrios: 16 barrios: Aguacate; Aguadilla barrio-pueblo; Arenales; Borinquen; Caimital Alto; Caimital Bajo; Camaceyes; Ceiba Alta; Ceiba Baja; Corrales; Guerrero; Maleza Alta; Maleza Baja; Montaña; Palmar; Victoria

Government
  - Mayor: Julio Roldán Concepción (PPD)
  - Senatorial dist.: 4 – Mayagüez/Aguadilla
  - Representative dist.: 17

Area
  - Municipality: 76.3 sq mi (198 km^{2})
  - Land: 36.6 sq mi (95 km^{2})
  - Water: 39.0 sq mi (101 km^{2}) 51%
- Elevation: 326 ft (99 m)

Population (2020)
  - Municipality: 55,101
  - Estimate (2025): 53,219 ▼
  - Rank: 12th in Puerto Rico
  - Density: 1,510/sq mi (581/km^{2})
  - Metro: 310,160 (MSA)
- Demonym: Aguadillanos

Racial groups
  - 2020 Census: 48.1% Multiracial; 21.0% White; 4.1% Black; 0.5% American Ind/AN; 0.1% Asian; 26.2% Other
- Time zone: UTC−4 (AST)
- ZIP Codes: 00603, 00604, 00605, 00690
- Area code: 787/939
- Website: aguadilla.gobierno.pr

Aguadilla (Spanish pronunciation: [aɣwaˈðiʝa], locally [awaˈðiʝa]), is a city and municipality located in the northwestern corner of the main island of Puerto Rico, bordered by the Atlantic Ocean to the north, Isabela to the east, Aguada and Moca to the south, and Aguadilla Bay to the west. Named after the diminutive of Aguada (watering place), it is spread over 15 barrios and Aguadilla Pueblo, the downtown area and administrative center. With a population of 55,101 as of the 2020 census, it is the principal city and core of the Aguadilla metropolitan area.

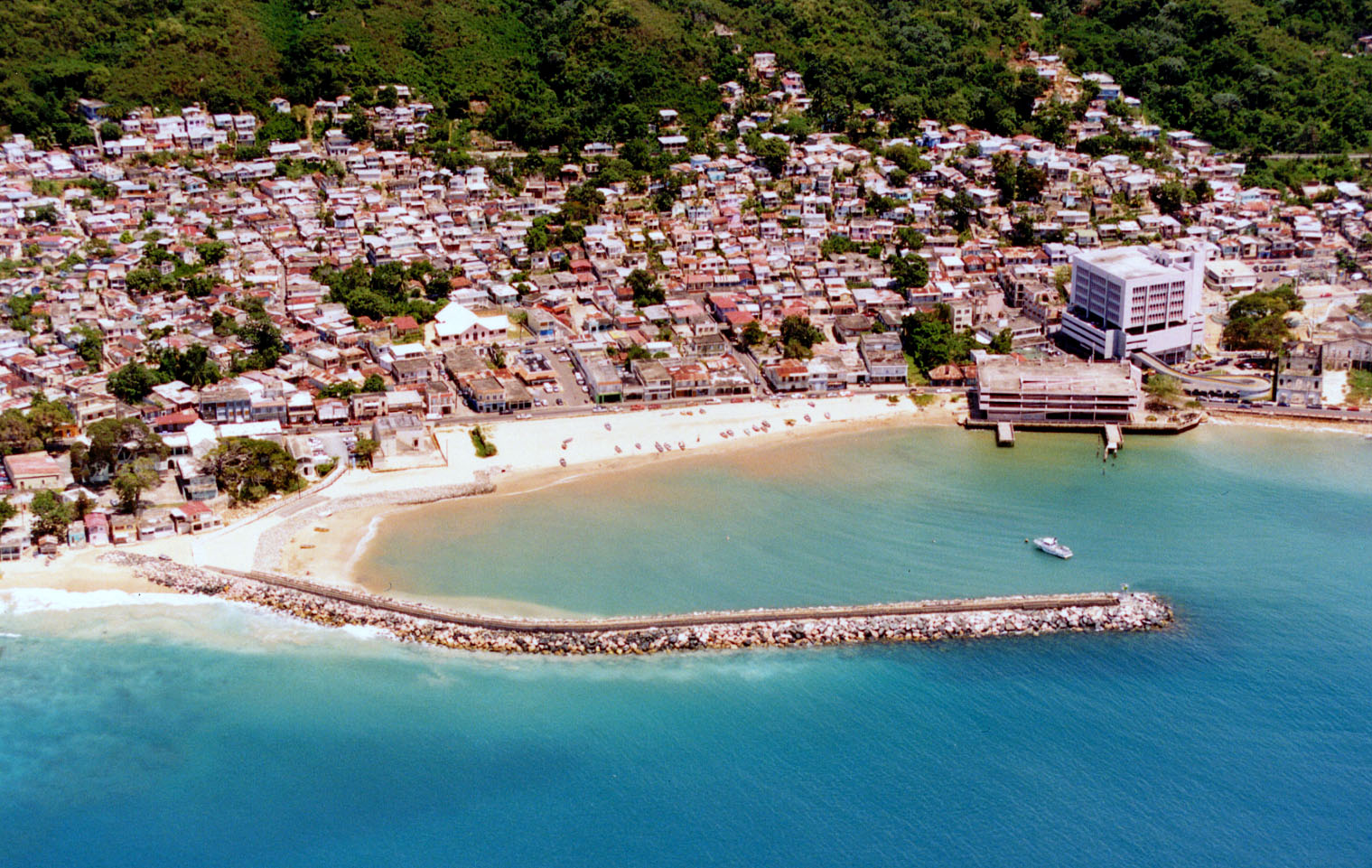
Aguadilla Pueblo or downtown area of Aguadilla, 2007

== Etymology and nicknames ==
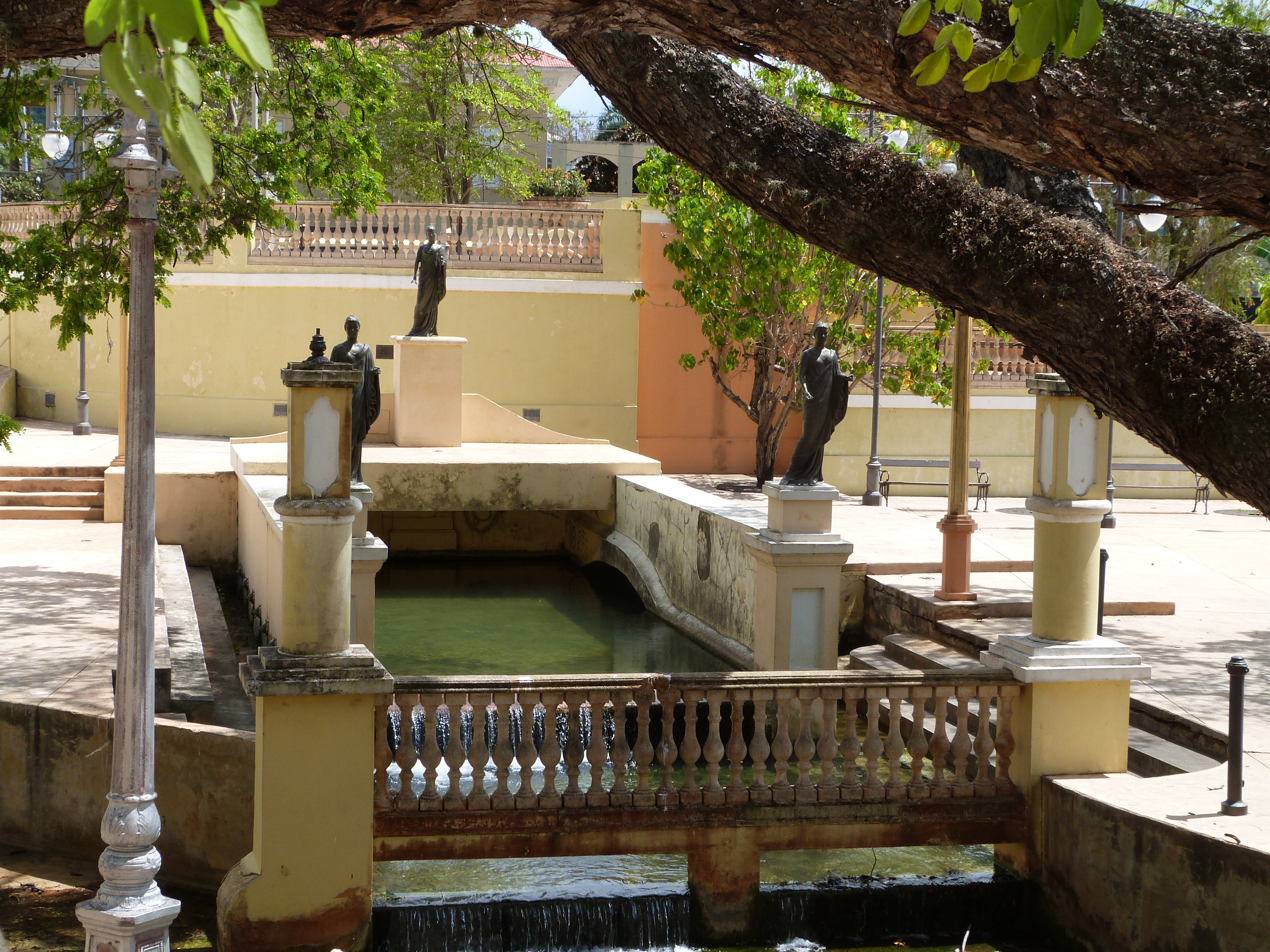
Ojo de Agua, water spring located in downtown (pueblo), which gives the municipality one of its nicknames

Aguadilla is a shortening of the town's original name San Carlos de La Aguadilla. The name Aguadilla is a diminutive of Aguada, which is the name of the town and municipality located to the south. Some of the municipality's nicknames are: Jardín del Atlántico ("Garden of the Atlantic"), Pueblo de los Tiburones ("Shark Town") and La Villa del Ojo de Agua ("Villa of the Water Spring") after the natural water spring that was used by early settlers and Spanish soldiers as a water source which is now located in El Parterre Square in Aguadilla Pueblo.

== History ==
=== Pre-Columbian settlements and foundation ===
According to sources, a Taíno settlement called Aymamón was located close to the Culebrinas River.

The present territory of Aguadilla was originally part of the territory of Aguada. Movement towards creating a separate municipality began as early as 1736. A resident of Aguada named Pedro de Arce wrote about the matter to the Spanish crown. In this document, widespread enthusiasm among the residents of the Aguadilla barrio in support for the idea is claimed. However, a strong opposition emerged from their neighbors in other areas of Aguada. This conflict stalled the process for decades. The first advances came in the form of a small chapel being built in 1770. Two years later, the community hosted influential Spanish politicians Luis de Córdova and Miguel de Muesas. Their host, Bernardo Sosa, and several neighbors requested them to lobby in favor of their request before peninsular authorities.

In 1775, the foundation of Aguadilla was approved by Córdova, with Sosa as the town's first mayor. Following the celebrations, a larger Church began being built. In 1776, Fray Íñigo Abbad y Lasierra in his description of the towns of the island, mentioned it as the "new Town of San Carlos de La Aguadilla."

But it was not until 1780 that the territory was properly segregated, making the founding of the town official. Originally, Aguadilla was constituted by the Victoria and Higüey barrios. The population in the town of Aguadilla continued to increase constantly mainly due to its excellent port and strategic location in the route of the boats. In 1776, when Santo Domingo became independent for the first time, the loyalists of Spanish descent emigrated to Puerto Rico, mainly to Aguadilla, which caused the population to continue increasing significantly.

=== 19th Century, becoming a Loyal Village ===
The early decades of the 19th Century brought with them several incidents that were a hindrance to the town economy, beginning with a large scale fire that destroyed most of the houses and had lasting repercussions. In 1825, hurricane Santa Ana struck Puerto Rico, destroying most of Aguadilla's orange farms. In 1831, according to Don Pedro Tomás de Córdova, the area or "party" of Aguadilla belonged to Aguada. At this time, the territorial organization of Aguadilla was as follows: Pueblo Norte (North Town), Pueblo Sur (South Town), Ceiba Alta, Ceiba Baja, Montaña, Malezas, Aguacate, Dos Palmas, Camaseyes, Plainela, Borinquen, Arenales, Higüey, Corrales, Victoria, and Mangual.

Don Pedro Tomás de Córdova mentions the road of Aguadilla formed by Punta Borinquen and San Francisco, as the "anchorage of the ships that travel from Europe to Havana and Mexico". He adds that its "port is the most frequented in the Island due to the proportions that it offers to refresh all class of ship." San Antonio community was established in the mid-19th century. It was populated by 60 families. Originally the place where these families were located was known as Bajura de Vadi, the place later to become known as San Antonio. In January 1841 a Royal Order transferred the judicial party from Aguada to Aguadilla.

In 1860, Aguadilla was officially declared a village (“villa leal”) by Queen Isabela II, with all the benefits associated with it. Several years later, when the island was territorially organized into seven departments, Aguadilla became the head of the third department that included the municipalities of Aguada, Isabela, Lares, Moca, Rincón, and San Sebastián. A municipal cemetery was inaugurated in 1804, but its space was limited by 1873. In 1878, according to Don Manuel Ebeda y Delgado, the territorial organization of Aguadilla had varied a little. At this time Plainela, Higüey, and Mangual barrios are not mentioned. The Dos Palmas barrio appears as Palmar. Also at this time, three new barrios are mentioned: Guerrero, Caimital Alto, and Caimital Bajo. In 1893, hurricane San Roque brought devastation to the village's plantation and destroyed some houses.

=== Following the Spanish-American War ===
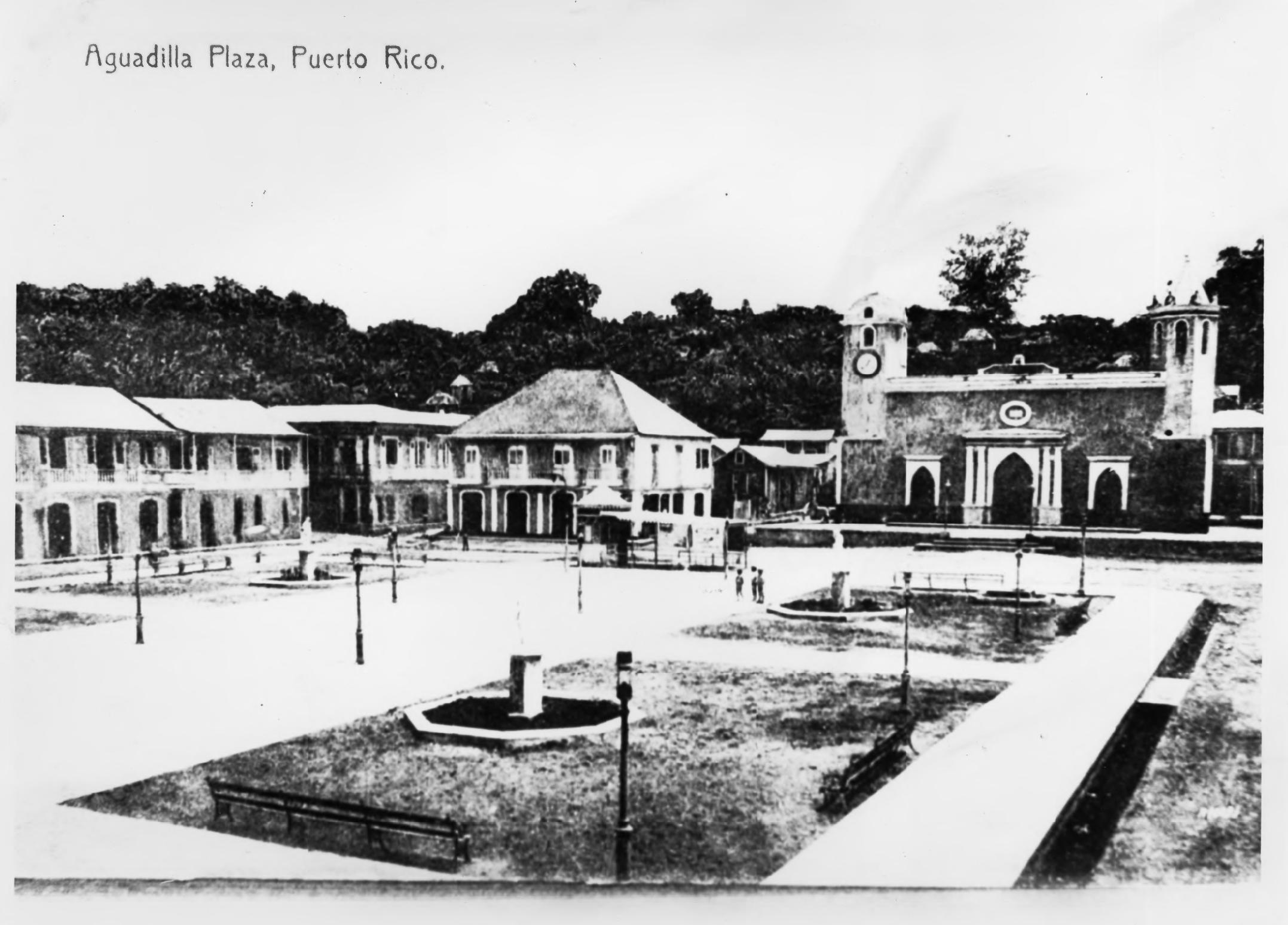
Aguadilla in 1910

Following the change of sovereignty over the island in 1898, the territorial organization of Aguadilla remained unchanged in comparison to 1878. A series of natural disasters would impact the town. In 1899, hurricane San Ciriaco passed over Puerto Rico, causing widespread destruction everywhere, including Aguadilla. In the Census held that year, downtown Aguadilla appears constituted by Higüey, Iglesia, Nueva, Santa Barbara, and Tamarindo barrios. Malezas barrio appears subdivided into Maleza Alta and Maleza Baja. The 1918 San Fermín earthquake, and the tsunami that followed, directly impacted Aguadilla, killing 40 and damaging or destroying several landmarks including the church and town hall. San Antonio was completely destroyed by the tsunami, due to its proximity to the shore. The residents of the community decided to re-localize to a higher area further from shore.

Luis R. Esteves and Juan Garcia established the first two theaters in the area. A new was social club form, known as "Luz del Porvenir" (Light of the Future). A new school system was the pride of the village because it offered them the opportunity to give their children an education without having to go 9 miles (14 km) south downtown. There was also a new bakery and a post office, among other facilities. At this time, the village also began its Patron Festival. The clothing industry was a major source of employment. In 1925, the District Hospital was inaugurated, later becoming known as “El Distrito”. After the Pedro J. Zamora Hospital opened in 1976, this facility became a private school.

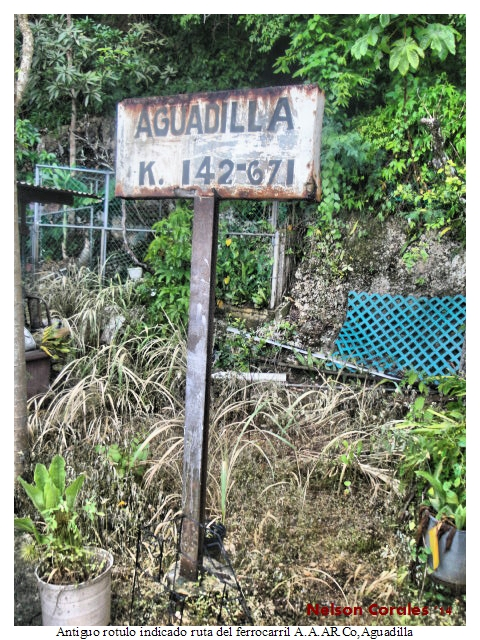
Sign at former train stop in Aguadilla

On the early morning hours of November 7, 1944, Puerto Rico suffered the worst railroad accident in its history. Train No. 3 was traveling from San Juan to Ponce carrying passengers to their different hometowns for the island general elections to be held that same day. It stopped at the Jiménez Station in Aguadilla for a routine engineer and boilerman exchange with Train No. 4 which was heading to San Juan. The engineer assigned to Train No. 3's ride from Jiménez Station to Ponce was José Antonio Román, an experienced freight train engineer who had never worked in passenger travel. When the train left the station at 2:00 am, it was carrying 6 passenger cars with hundreds of commuters and two freight cars.

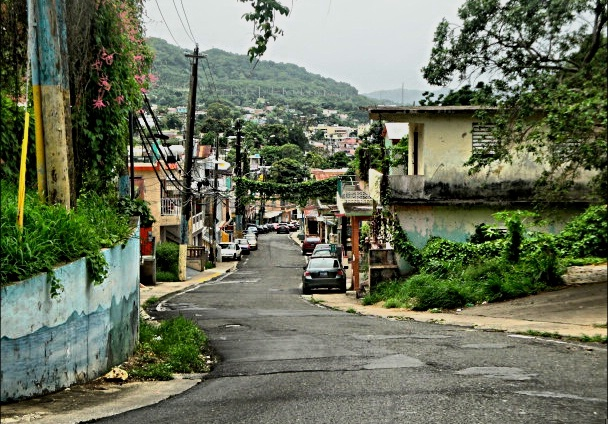
Cuesta Vieja, a sector of Aguadilla, where the train derailed

At 2:20 a.m. the train started to descend a hill section known as Cuesta Vieja (Old Hill) in Aguadilla at, what some witnesses described as, an exaggerated speed. When the train reached the leveling-off point at the bottom of the hill it derailed. The steam locomotive crashed into a ditch where it exploded and one of the freight cars crashed into one of the passenger cars, killing many inside and injuring several. Witnesses described the scene as horrendous, with some accounts stating that parents were throwing their children out the windows to save them from the wreckage. Chief of Police Guillermo Arroyo stated that the locomotive (No. 72), the express car, and three second class passenger cars were completely destroyed. Oscar Valle, an Aguadilla correspondent to El Mundo newspaper, summarized the scene with: "The locomotive suffered a terrible explosion as it derailed, and the impact was so strong that 3 passenger cars were converted into a fantastic mound of wreckage". In the end, 16 passengers lost their lives, including the engineer and the boilerman, and 50 were injured in the crash.

The territorial organization of Aguadilla did not change, until 1948, when the Puerto Rico Planning, Urbanization, and Zoning Board prepared the map of the city and its barrios, and following instructions of city authorities, Higüey and parts of Caimital Alto barrios are annexed to Downtown Aguadilla. During that decade, there had been a territorial dispute with Aguada, when that municipality claimed that the area belonging to Parque Colón was on their side of the Culebrinas river. The matter became contentious when a diversion was made of the original route in 1931, with Aguada mayor Julio César Román basing its complain on Law 60-1945, preparing a memorial with historical maps and other documents supporting its position that the old geographic divisions remained, which was presented before the board on September 20, 1946. The municipality alleged that taxes had been paid over these terrains, which Aguadilla refuted by claiming that adequate corrections had taken place. The agency called for public hearings and a visual inspection, but emphasized that it had the sole jurisdiction to decide the outcome. A historical report was commissioned to Adolfo de Hostos, the Puerto Rico Government's Historian. The matter was contentious enough that it attracted parties from other places, such as a physician from Rio Piedras named Carlos González, who supported Aguada's claim. The Board ruled that Parque Colón belonged to Aguada, with mayor Alfredo González Pérez appealing the decision. Ultimately, Aguadilla prevailed and the contentious area remained in its jurisdiction.

=== Militarization during the Cold War ===
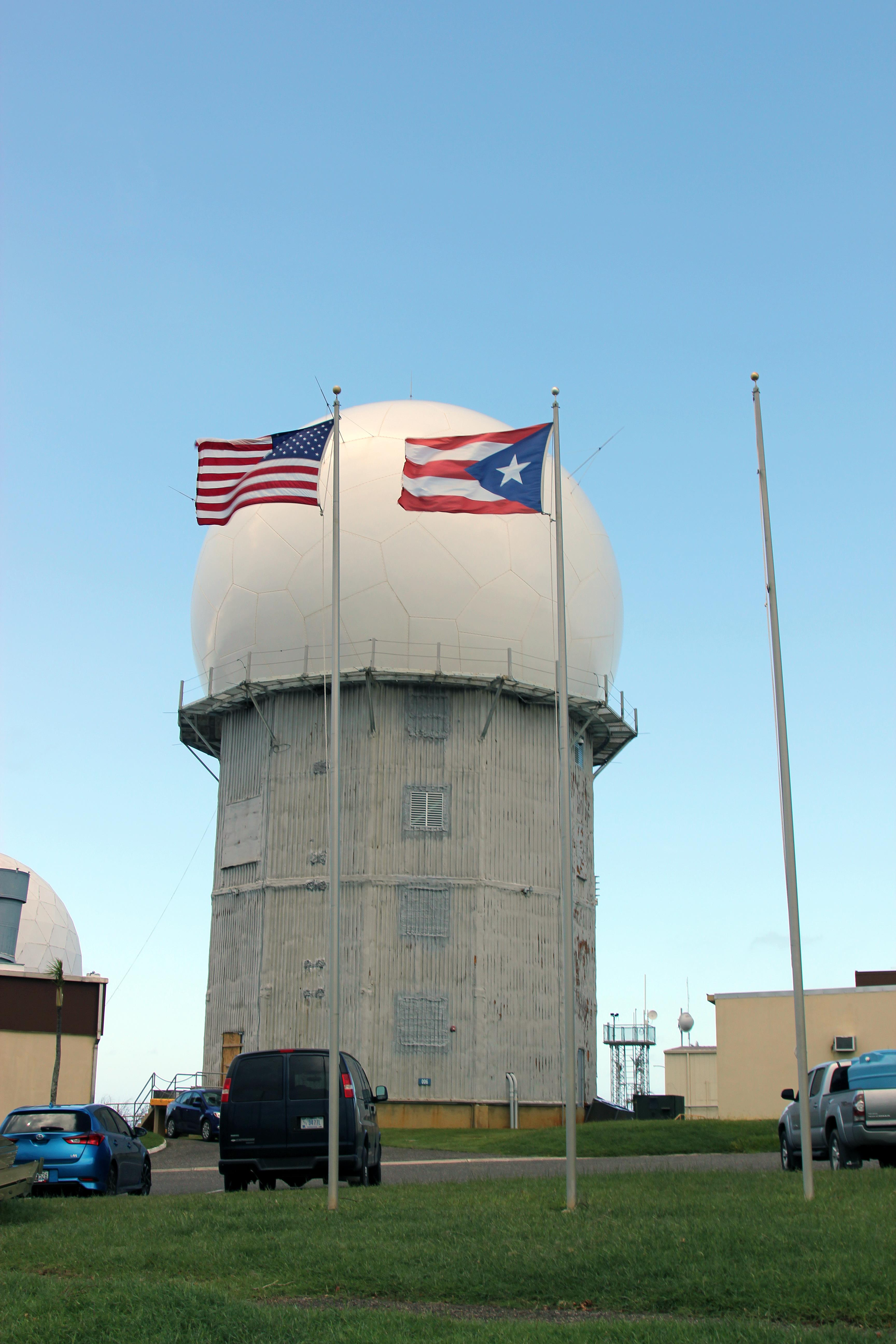
FAA radar tower in Aguadilla, Puerto Rico

In September 1939, some 3,796 acres (15.4 km^{2}) covered by sugar cane, was expropriated for the military at the cost of $1,215,000, in order to build an air base that came to be known as Ramey Air Force Base. San Antonio's ambitions to become a separate town were unfruitful, and the community suffered three expropriations as a result of expansions to Ramey. In the process, Roberto Román Acevedo designed a town flag and emblem for the ostensible project. Aguadilla hosted these facilities for almost five decades. During this period, Aguadilla was home to the Strategic Air Command, equipped with RB-36s and 72d Bombardment Wing, Heavy equipped with B-52s, an important strategic facility during the Cold War.

Activated in June 1952 as a Strategic Air Command very long-range reconnaissance unit at Ramey AFB, Puerto Rico, but not operational until October 1952. Redesignated as 72d Strategic Reconnaissance Wing and received 3 (60th, 73rd and 301st) squadrons of RB-36D/E/F/H Peacemaker bombers. Also, the 915th Air Rescue Squadron. Conducted global strategic reconnaissance 1953–1955, gradually shifting to a bombardment training mission beginning in 1954, being upgraded to B-36J and B-36J(III) Featherweights by 1955. Redesignated 72d Bombardment Wing in 1958. With the phaseout of the B-36s in 1958, received B-52G Stratofortress intercontinental strategic bombers.

The town's urban center was reformatted, with a new plaza named after Federico Degetau y González being inaugurated on September 30, 1955. In 1971, Aguadilla lost its spot as Senatorial District Head following an electoral reform that included it in the new Mayagüez-Aguadilla District. During that decade, the municipality emphasized industry, with a facility that fabricated aviation parts being established at the base's hangars in 1979. Five years earlier, an agreement to establish a DeLorean Motor Company plant at Calero was publicly announced, but the facility was ultimately built at Northern Ireland. The municipality's main tourist site, Hotel Montemar was reworked into Parador Montemar.

Though the military infrastructure still exists, the airport was handed over to the Government of Puerto Rico in 1973. The aerial facilities are now controlled by the Puerto Rico Ports Authority and comprise the Rafael Hernández International Airport. The barracks now host the Faro Inn Suites, a 79-room hotel. The Officer's Club now hosts the Faro Conference Center, a 22,000-square-foot (2,000 m^{2}) meeting facility. The hospital is now the Courtyard by Marriott Punta Borinquen Resort & Casino, a 150-room hotel with a casino and the first Marriott in Puerto Rico outside of the San Juan Metropolitan Area.

The area which formerly housed Ramey also hosts the University of Puerto Rico at Aguadilla and the Friedrich Froebel Bilingual School (K-9). The high school became Ramey Job Corps Campus and the elementary school became the Esther Feliciano Mendoza Middle School. Centro de Adiestramiento y Bellas Artes (CABA) since 1979 has been the only public school of arts in Puerto Rico (7–12). Ramey is also the site of the Ramey Skating Park and a new mariposario (butterfly farm) and the Ramey Shopping Center.

By 1980, the population of Agadilla had risen to more than 54,600 residents, most of which lived in the urban areas of the municipality. There is still an active part of the base that hosts the Coast Guard Borinquen Air Station. There are also other government agencies based at Ramey, including the United States Department of Homeland Security, U.S. Customs & Border Protection's Office of Air and Marine and Office of Border Patrol, the Fuerzas Unidas de Rápida Acción (United Forces for Rapid Action) of the Puerto Rico Police Department and the Puerto Rico National Guard. There is also a post office, the Centro de Servicios al Conductor (DMV), a bakery, and a Banco Popular de Puerto Rico location.

=== Early 21st Century and Hurricane Maria ===
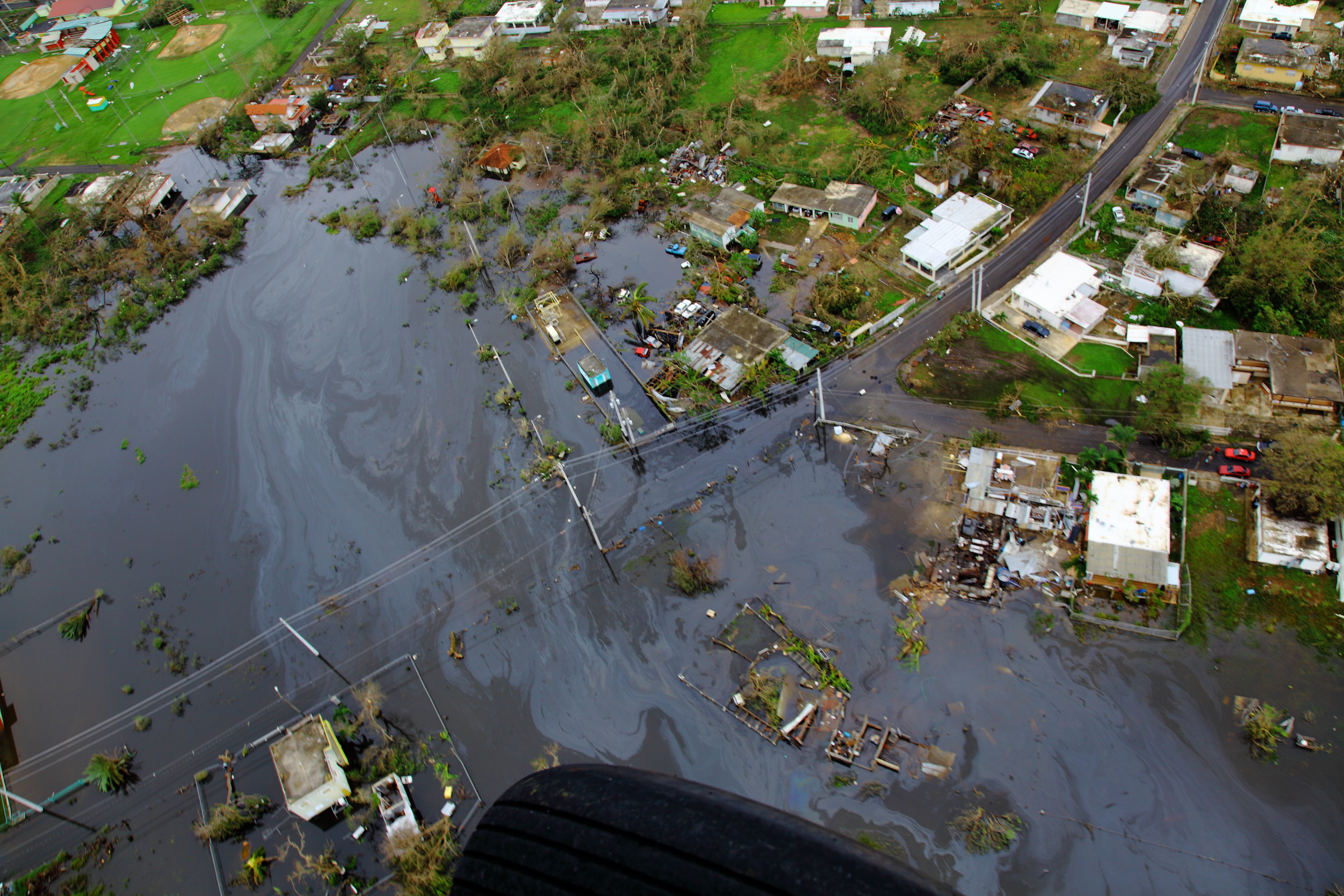
Aerial view of Aguadilla a few days after Hurricane Maria

Hurricane Maria struck Puerto Rico on September 20, 2017, causing large-scale damage and destruction to infrastructure. In Aguadilla 10 inches of rain were recorded and its more than 54,000 residents were left with no electrical power.

The four radar systems used by the Federal Aviation Administration for flights in and around Puerto Rico were damaged by Hurricane Maria, and it took nearly two weeks to fix them. One of the radar systems is located in Aguadilla.

=== The 2020s ===
In recent years, the town has gathered some international celebrity due to the release of a Unidentified Anomalous Phenomena (UAP) footage captured by a Customs and Patrol aircraft near Rafael Hernández Airport on April 26, 2013, after the air traffic tower reported sighting a pinkish glowing orb flying near the facility. The 5-minute long thermal sequence was captured with a FLIR camera and released by the agency in September 2023, one of several acknowledged by the government as filmed by an official source since 2018, becoming colloquially known as “The Aguadilla UFO Incident”. Initially sent to Homeland Security for analysis, the film was then remitted to the Air Force before ultimately being released to civilian groups interested in the topic. The Scientific Coalition for Unidentified Aerial Phenomena (SCU) has called it the "most compelling" footage of the anomalous aerial activity. Since then, the footage has been replayed in several shows covering fringe topics, mostly aired in network television such as the History Channel, National Geographic and Discovery Channel. Debate remains ongoing, with Chinese lanterns, drones, birds and balloons being proposed as potential explanations by skeptics.

In September 2024, the municipal government filed a lawsuit against private consortium LUMA Energy, citing collective losses related to the corporation's mismanagement of the energy distribution system.

== Geography ==
Aguadilla is located in the northwest coast of the island of Puerto Rico, in the Western Coastal Plains. It is bordered by the Atlantic Ocean in the north, the municipalities of Isabela on the east, and Moca and Aguada in the south.

The area of the municipality is 35.5 square miles. It is mostly plain, with some notable hills being Jiménez (728 feet) and Viñet (689 feet). It has only one river, the Culebrinas, which separates Aguadilla from Aguada. Also, Cedro Creek which separates Aguadilla from Isabela in the north.

=== Barrios ===
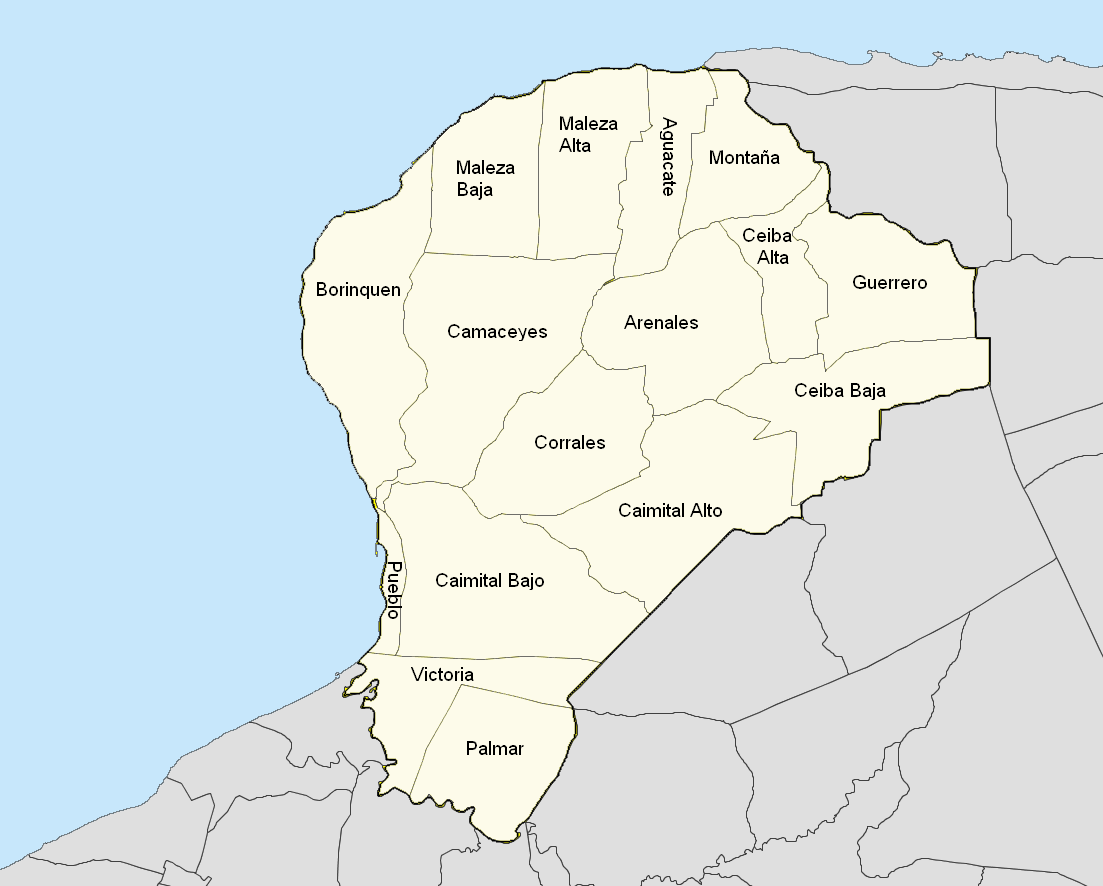
Barrios of Aguadilla

Like all municipalities of Puerto Rico, Aguadilla is subdivided into barrios (wards). The municipal government buildings, central square and large Catholic church are located in barrio Pueblo.

1. Aguacate
2. Aguadilla barrio-pueblo
3. Arenales
4. Borinquen
5. Caimital Alto
6. Caimital Bajo
7. Camaceyes
8. Ceiba Alta
9. Ceiba Baja
10. Corrales
11. Guerrero
12. Maleza Alta
13. Maleza Baja
14. Montaña
15. Palmar
16. Victoria

=== Sectors ===
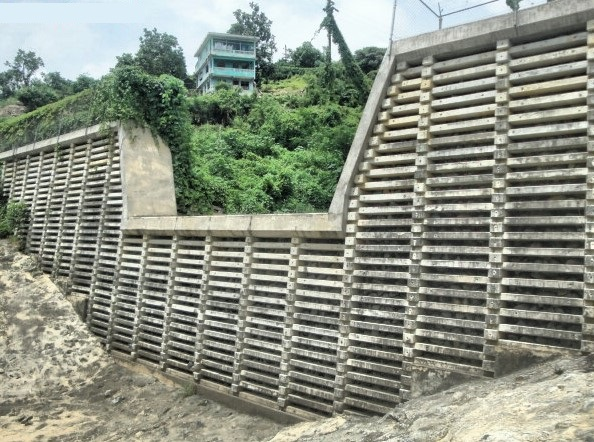
A structure is used for flood-control in Sector La Via, a Special Community in Aguadilla.

Barrios (which are, in contemporary times, roughly comparable to minor civil divisions) in turn are further subdivided into smaller local populated place areas/units called sectores (which means sectors in English). The types of sectores may vary, from normally sector to urbanización to reparto to barriada to residencial, among others.

=== Special Communities ===
Comunidades Especiales de Puerto Rico (Special Communities of Puerto Rico) are marginalized communities whose citizens are experiencing a certain amount of social exclusion. A map shows these communities occur in nearly every municipality of the commonwealth. Of the 742 places that were on the list in 2014, the following barrios, communities, sectors, or neighborhoods were in Aguadilla: El Palmar, Cerro Calero, Cerro Visbal, Cuesta Vieja, La Vía, and Poblado San Antonio.

=== Temperature of sea ===
Aguadilla
| Jan | Feb | Mar | Apr | May | Jun | Jul | Aug | Sep | Oct | Nov | Dec | Year |
|---|---|---|---|---|---|---|---|---|---|---|---|---|
| 77 °F (25 °C) | 75 °F (24 °C) | 77 °F (25 °C) | 77 °F (25 °C) | 79 °F (26 °C) | 81 °F (27 °C) | 84 °F (29 °C) | 84 °F (29 °C) | 86 °F (30 °C) | 84 °F (29 °C) | 82 °F (28 °C) | 79 °F (26 °C) | 78.8 °F (26.0 °C) |

== Economy ==
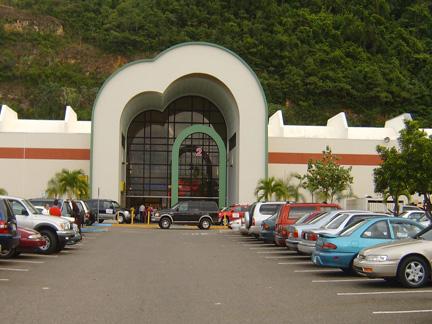
An entrance to Aguadilla Mall

The city is currently home to a variety of industrial and pharmaceutical plants such as LifeScan, Symmetricom, Honeywell, and Hewlett Packard Enterprise. Most of them are located at San Antonio Technological Park. The airport has Lufthansa Technik, while others like Suiza Dairy, Lockheed Martin and Productos La Aguadillana are located in Camaseyes Industrial Park. Other industries that are based in Aguadilla are rubber, plastics, leather, textiles, steel, wood, machinery, and food processing.

The retail sector is another source of economy in Aguadilla. Shopping malls like Aguadilla Mall, Aguadilla Shopping Center, Aguadilla Town Center, and others are some of the main commercial and retail centers of the city.

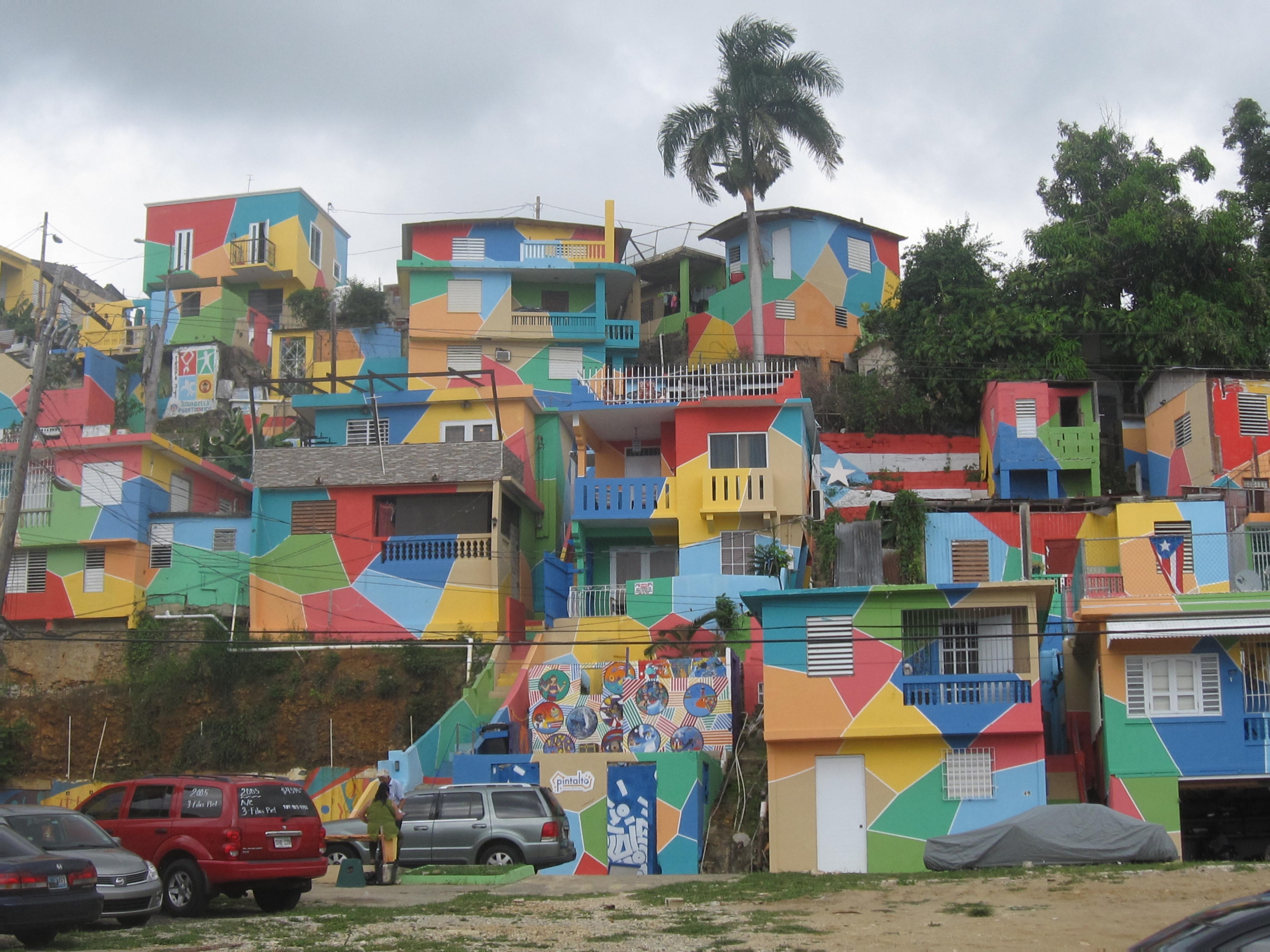
"Pintalto" project in Cerro Cabrera

In 2018, Suiza Dairy, a milk brand, opened a plant in Aguadilla at the cost of $40,000,000 United States dollars. The plant is expected to earn $160,000,000 US dollars in the period from 2018 to 2038.

In 2019, Aguadilla received the City Livability Award from the United States Conference of Mayors and honored the efforts spearheaded by Carlos Méndez Martínez. Specifically mentioned was "Pintalto", a project where Cerro Cabrero area, in the downtown area of Aguadilla was painted in rich, lively colors.

=== Tourism ===
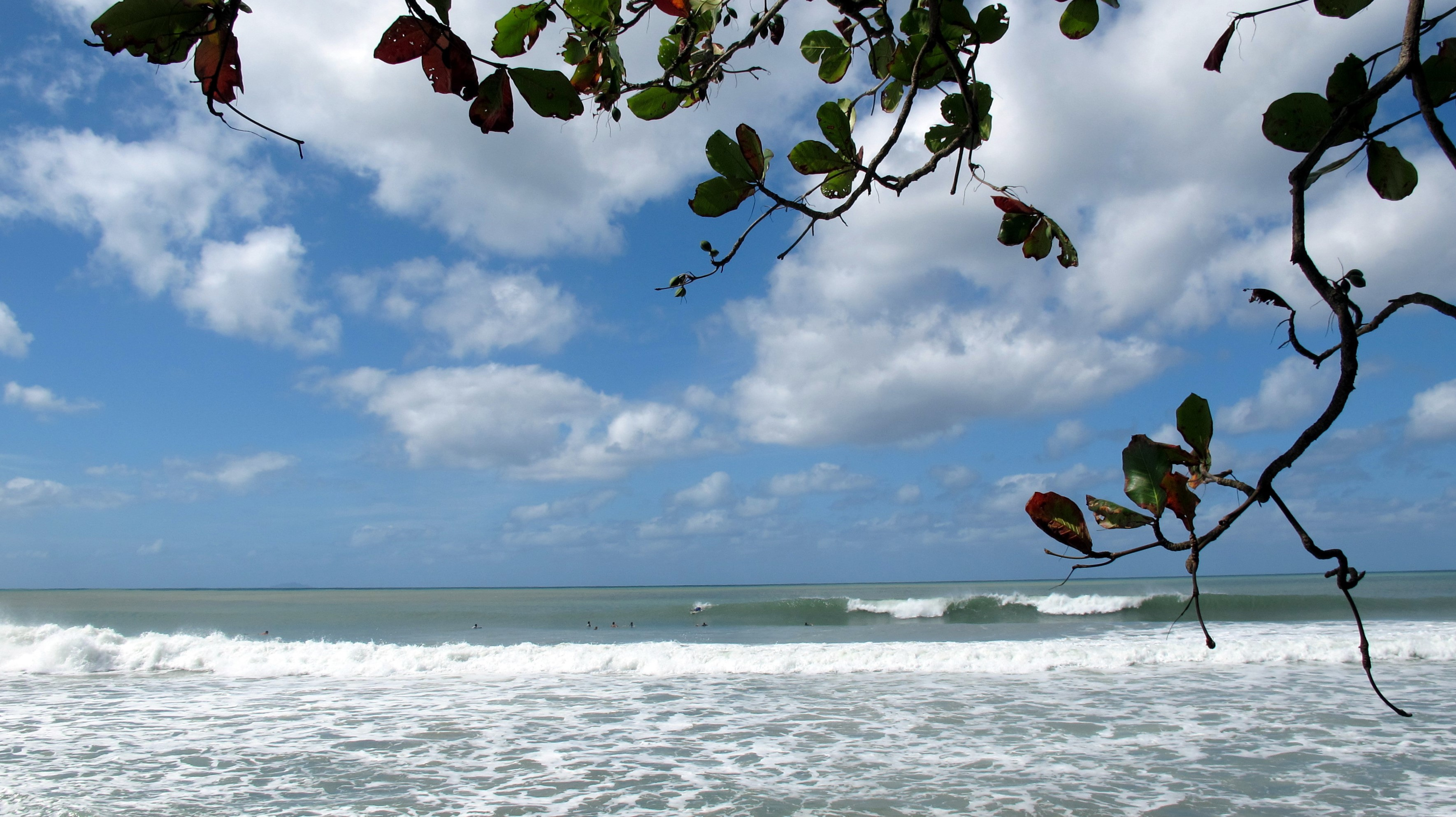
Schoolyards Beach, surf spot in Aguadilla

Aguadilla is part of the Porta del Sol touristic region in Puerto Rico. The Porta del Sol website highlights Aguadilla's beaches for surfing.

According to the Puerto Rico Department of Natural and Environmental Resources, Aguadilla has the most beaches on the island, with nineteen in total. Some of the beaches are considered among the best for surfing, like Surfer's Beach, Gas Chambers, Crash Boat, Wilderness, among others. Because of this, Aguadilla has served as host to surfing competitions, like the ISA World Championship in 1988.

Other attractions of the town are Las Cascadas Water Park and the Aguadilla Ice Skating Arena, which is the only ice skating complex in the Caribbean.

=== Landmarks and places of interest ===
There are nine places in Aguadilla listed on the US National Register of Historic Places:

- Old Urban Cemetery
- Casa de Piedra
- District Courthouse (Aguadilla, Puerto Rico)
- El Parterre, Ojo de Agua
- Punta Borinquen Light
- Fuerte de la Concepción
- Iglesia de San Carlos Borromeo – Church San Carlos Borromeo
- Cardona Residence
- López Residence

Other places of interest in Aguadilla include:

- Aguadilla City Hall – originally built in 1918. Reconstructed after the 1918 earthquake.
- Banyan Treehouse – wooden house around a banyan tree (none of its parts touch the tree)
- Campanitas de Cristal, a fountain
- Christopher Columbus Monument – a monument which consists of a cross originally made of marble, and had to be rebuilt after the earthquake.
- Parque Cristóbal Colón, a park
- El Merendero
- Fisherman's Monument
- Jardín del Atlántico, a square
- Las Cascadas (The Waterfalls) Water Park (Closed after Hurricane Maria in 2017)
- Old Sugar Pier of Aguadilla
- Paseo Miguel Garcia Méndez
- Punta Borinquen Golf Course – an 18-hole golf course, originally built for President Dwight D. Eisenhower.
- Punta Borinquen Lighthouse and ruins
- Rafael Hernández Monument
- Rafael Hernández Square
- Ramey Skate Park, a skatepark at the Ramey Military Base
- Youth Fountain at Juan Ponce de León Park

To stimulate local tourism during the COVID-19 pandemic in Puerto Rico, the Puerto Rico Tourism Company launched the Voy Turistiendo ("I'm Touring") campaign in 2021. The campaign featured a passport book with a page for each municipality. The Voy Turisteando Aguadilla passport page lists Crash Boat Beach, Survival Beach, Rompeolas Beach, and Peña Blanca Beach as places of interest for locals.

=== Beaches ===
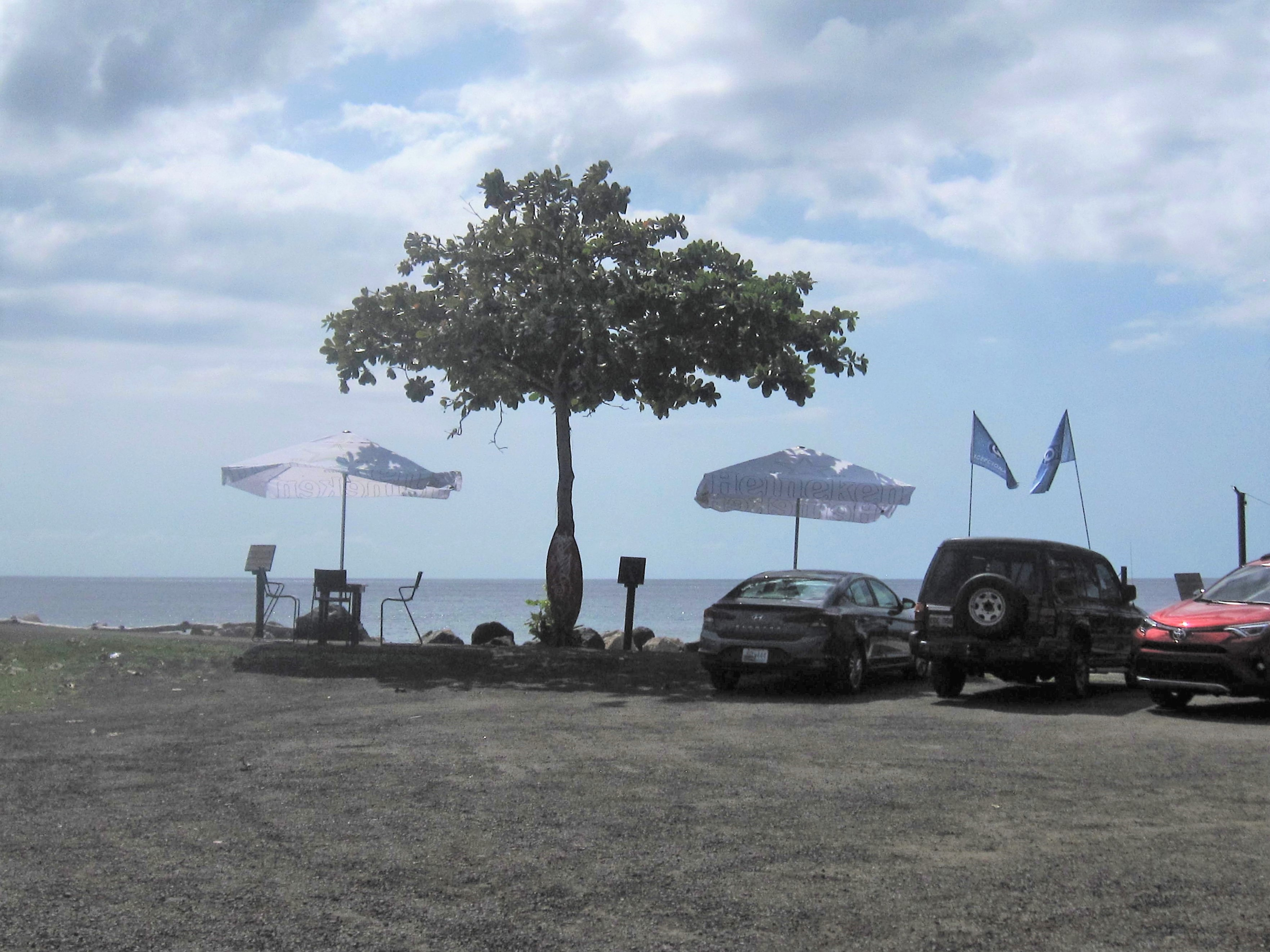
View from Rompeolas Bar and Grill, at Rompeolas Beach in Aguadilla

There are 32 beaches in Aguadilla. Some of the more well-known beaches include:

- Balneario Municipal de Aguadilla (GNIS ID 1990599)
- Playa La Ruina (GNIS ID 1991881) also called Wilderness Beach or Las Ruinas ("The Ruins" in English)
- Playa Punta Borinquen (GNIS ID 1991891)
- Crash Boat Beach
- Survival Beach
- Surfer's Beach
- Rompeolas Beach / Rompeolas Beach North also known as Playa Tamarindo

== Culture ==
=== Festivals and events ===
Aguadilla celebrates its patron saint festival in October. The Fiestas Patronales de San Carlos Borromeo is a religious and cultural celebration that generally features parades, games, artisans, amusement rides, regional food, and live entertainment.

Other festivals and events celebrated in Aguadilla include:

- Velorio de Reyes – Celebrated mostly in January, they are a religious ceremony held as gratitude to the Three Kings for some answered prayer. They usually consist of hymns, prayers, and other religious expressions.
- Kite Festival – Held in April, it includes kiosks, music, and kite flying.
- Fiestas San Antonio – April
- Verbena de Corrales – May
- Beach Festival – June
- Festival del Atún – Celebrated in July, it is a festival dedicated to the fishing of the tuna.
- Festival de la Música – July

=== Sports ===
Aguadilla is home to several professional and amateur sports teams. The most notable are the Aguadilla Divas of the Female Superior Volleyball League, and the Aguadilla Sharks of the Superior Baseball League (Double-A). The Divas play their home games in the Luis T. Díaz Coliseum in Downtown Aguadilla from January to March, while the Sharks play their home games at Luis A. Canena Márquez Stadium from February to May.

| Club | League | Sport | Venue |
|---|---|---|---|
| Aguadilla Sharks | Superior Baseball League | Baseball | Luis A. Canena Márquez Stadium |
| Aguadilla Divas | Female Superior Volleyball League | Volleyball | Luis T. Diaz Coliseum |

Aguadilla also had a professional basketball team called the Aguadilla Sharks, that played for the BSN league. This team was merged into the Cangrejeros de Santurce in 1998.

Aguadilla is also a place where many famous baseball players originate from. There are plans for a future ECHL Minor League Hockey franchise for the city.

== Communication ==
=== Radio ===
- WABA WABA La Grande 850AM is located in Aguadilla.
- WWNA better known as Radio Una 1340AM is located in Aguadilla.
- WVOZ WAPA Radio frequency 1580AM is located in Aguadilla.

=== Television ===
- WOLE-TV 12.
- WELU is a religious broadcast company.
- WSJP-LD CW 18 is a CW Television Network affiliated station.

== Demographics ==
Historical population
| Census | Pop. | Note | %± |
|---|---|---|---|
| 1900 | 17,830 | | — |
| 1910 | 21,419 | | 20.1% |
| 1920 | 24,287 | | 13.4% |
| 1930 | 28,319 | | 16.6% |
| 1940 | 34,956 | | 23.4% |
| 1950 | 44,357 | | 26.9% |
| 1960 | 47,864 | | 7.9% |
| 1970 | 51,355 | | 7.3% |
| 1980 | 54,606 | | 6.3% |
| 1990 | 59,335 | | 8.7% |
| 2000 | 64,685 | | 9.0% |
| 2010 | 60,949 | | −5.8% |
| 2020 | 55,101 | | −9.6% |
| 2025 (est.) | 53,219 | ▼ | −3.4% |
U.S. Decennial Census; 1899 (shown as 1900) 1910–1930; 1930–1950 1960–2000 2010 2020

The 1887 census conducted by Spain showed Aguadilla had a population of 16,140.

According to the US 2010 Census, there were 60,949 people in the city. This represents a decrease of more than 3,000 from the 2000 Census. The population density was 1,668.5 inhabitants per square mile (644.2/km^{2}). The 2020 Census indicated the municipality has 55,101 residents representing a decline of over 5,000 residents.

As a whole, Puerto Rico is populated mainly by people from Creole or Spanish and European descent. Statistics taken from the 2000 census shows that 83.6% of Aguadillanos identify as having Spanish or white origin, 5.0% are black, 0.2% are Amerindian, 0.2% Asian, 0.1% Native Hawaiian/Pacific Islander, 8.2% were some other race, and 2.8% two or more races.

In March 2012, unemployment was at 16.2%, which is the same percent it was in November 2010.

=== Religion ===
Most Aguadillanos are Christian with a majority being Roman Catholic. Like most cities in Puerto Rico Aguadilla has their Catholic church located on the main square in their downtown. There is also a significant community of Jehovah's Witnesses and Protestants including Pentecostals and Adventists.

Aguadilla has an Islamic community with and Islamic Center located on PR-111 in Palmar barrio.

== Government ==
=== City ===
All municipalities in Puerto Rico are administered by a mayor, elected every four years. The current mayor of Aguadilla is Julio Roldán Concepción, of the Popular Democratic Party (PPD).

=== State ===
Most state agencies are based at the Government Center Building with the exception of the Corporación del Seguro del Estado (State Insurance Agency) and the Centro de Servicios al Conductor (Driver's Services Center). Most state agencies left their offices after the Senatorial District was taken away from Aguadilla.

=== Public safety ===
Aguadilla has its own police department, Policía Municipal Aguadilla (Aguadilla City Police Department), located in Aguadilla Pueblo. The A.C.P.D. only has jurisdiction in the municipality of Aguadilla and provide service and protection to local citizens and travelers alike.

Aguadilla also hosts the Puerto Rico Police Department Command for its Region. This region covers Aguada, Aguadilla, Isabela, Moca, Rincón and San Sebastián. It also hosts the PRPD Highway Patrol Division for its region, the FURA Division of the PRPD, the US Army Reserve Center, PR National Guard, U.S. Coast Guard, and the Border Patrol. It is also served by another PRPD station in San Antonio Village (Precinct 203 Ramey-San Antonio).

The city has a single correctional facility, Guerrero Correctional Institution, operated by the Puerto Rico Department of Corrections and Rehabilitation.

In recent years, Aguadilla has seen an increase in Type I crimes, which include murder, burglary, and theft.

=== FBI satellite office ===
There is an FBI satellite office located in Aguadilla.

=== Mayors ===
| # | Mayor | Term | Party | Notes |
|---|---|---|---|---|
| 1st | Adrián del Valle | 1899–1903 | None | |
| 2nd | José Monserrate Deliz | 1903–1905 | None | |
| 3rd | Luis A. Torregrosa | 1905–1907 | None | |
| 4th | José Francisco Estévez | 1907–1911 | None | |
| 5th | Ramón Añeses Morell | 1911–1933 | None | |
| 6th | Wenceslao Herrera Alfonso | 1933–1941 | None | |
| 7th | José Badillo Nieves | 1941–1945 | None | |
| 8th | Rodolfo Acevedo | 1945 | None | |
| 9th | Fernando Milán | 1945–1949 | None | |
| 10th | Rafael Cabán Peña | 1949–1953 | None | |
| 11th | Rafael A. Guntín López | 1953–1957 | None | |
| 12th | Herminio Blás | 1957 | None | |
| 13th | José Acevedo Álvarez | 1957–1969 | None | |
| 14th | Emilio Cerezo Muñoz | 1969–1973 | PNP | |
| 15th | Conchita Igartúa de Suárez | 1973–1977 | PPD | |
| 16th | Joaquín Acevedo Moreno | 1977–1981 | PNP | |
| 17th | Alfredo González Pérez | 1981–1987 | PPD | |
| 18th | Gustavo Herrera López | 1987–1989 | PPD | Interim |
| 19th | Ramón Calero Bermúdez | 1989–1996 | PNP | Died in 1996 while in office |
| 20th | Agnes Bermúdez Acevedo | 1996–1997 | PNP | Interim |
| 21st | Carlos Méndez Martínez | 1997–2020 | PNP | Resigned on January 27, 2020 |
| 22nd | Yanitsia Irizarry Méndez | 2020–2021 | PNP | |
| 23rd | Julio Roldán Concepción | 2021–present | PPD | Incumbent |

=== Senate ===
The city belongs to the Puerto Rico Senatorial district IV, which is represented by two Senators. In 2016, Evelyn Vázquez and Luis Daniel Muñiz were elected as District Senators.

== Symbols ==
The municipio has an official flag and coat of arms.

=== Flag ===
The flag consists of two horizontal stripes of equal size. The upper one is blue and the lower gold, which are the predominant colors in the shield, which is placed in the center of it.

=== Coat of arms ===
Based on a design by Alberto Vadi, the coat of arms was organized by Herman Reichard Esteves and José J. Santa-Pinter under the direction of the Aguadilla municipal administration and was approved by the municipal assembly on June 29, 1972.

== Education ==
=== Public schools ===
In all of the island's municipalities, public education is overseen by the Puerto Rico Department of Education. Aguadilla hosts the Head Start Program for Aguadilla, Aguada, Moca, Rincón, and San Sebastián and a number of private institutions.

As of 2018-2019 the following public schools were operational in Aguadilla:

1. Ana M. Javariz is a rural elementary school located in Urb. El Prado offering grades K-6 with about 215 students.
2. Antonio Badillo Hernández is a rural, elementary school located in Montaña offering grades K–6 with about 327 students.
3. Homero Rivera Sola is a rural elementary school located in Corrales barrio offering grades K–6 with about 153 students.
4. José de Diego is a rural elementary school located in Res. José de Diego offering grades K–6 with about 242 students.
5. Luis Muñoz Rivera is a rural elementary school located in Camaseyes barrio offering grades K–6 with about 206 students.
6. Antonio Badillo Hernandez is a rural intermediate school located in Montaña barrio offering grades 7–9 with about 336 students.
7. Ester Feliciano Mendoza is a rural intermediate school offering grades 6–8 with about 416 students.
8. Benito Cerezo Vázquez is a rural high school located in Borinquen barrio offering grades 10–12 with about 435 students.
9. Juan Suárez Pelegrina is a rural high school located in Montaña barrio offering grades 10–12 with about 715 students.
10. Salvador Fuentes is a rural high school located in Ramey base offering grades 10–12 with about 288 students.
11. Centro de Adiestramiento y Bellas Artes (CABA) is a school that specializes in the arts located in Ramey base. In 2016, it served about 500 students.
12. Su Conchita Igartua de Suárez is a rural elementary school offering grades PreK–8, with about 768 students.

=== Higher education ===
Aguadilla hosts the following universities:

- Puerto Rico Aviation Maintenance Institute
- Aeronautical and Aerospace Institute of Puerto Rico (AAIPR)
- University of Puerto Rico at Aguadilla
- Metropolitan University, Aguadilla Campus
- Interamerican University of Puerto Rico, Aguadilla Campus
- Automeca Technical College
- Puerto Rico Criminal Justice College, Aguadilla Campus (Puerto Rico Police Academy) Ramey Job Corps also serves those who want to attain a higher education.

=== Aguadilla Library System ===
There is a digital library in San Antonio Village and another in downtown Aguadilla (Aguadilla barrio-pueblo).

== Health ==
There are two major medical facilities in Aguadilla.

- Hospital Buen Samaritano (Good Samaritan Hospital)
- Aguadilla Medical Services
- Sala de Urgencias San Francisco (road#2)
- Metro Pavia Clinic Aguadilla

== Transportation ==
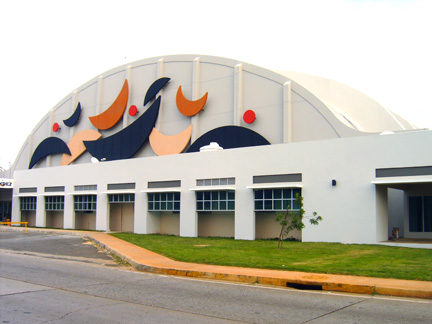
Rafael Hernández International Airport – View of the Passenger Terminal

=== Air ===
Rafael Hernández Airport is located in the city of Aguadilla. In recent years, it has seen a resurgence as an international airport in the island, with several airlines planning flights to the US from Aguadilla.

=== Roads ===
Interstate PR-2 (Rafael Henández Highway). Plans are underway for a new expressway, an expansion to existing Puerto Rico Highway 22 (José de Diego Expressway) from Hatillo and it will probably end at Puerto Rico Highway 111. There are 13 bridges in Aguadilla.

== Gallery ==
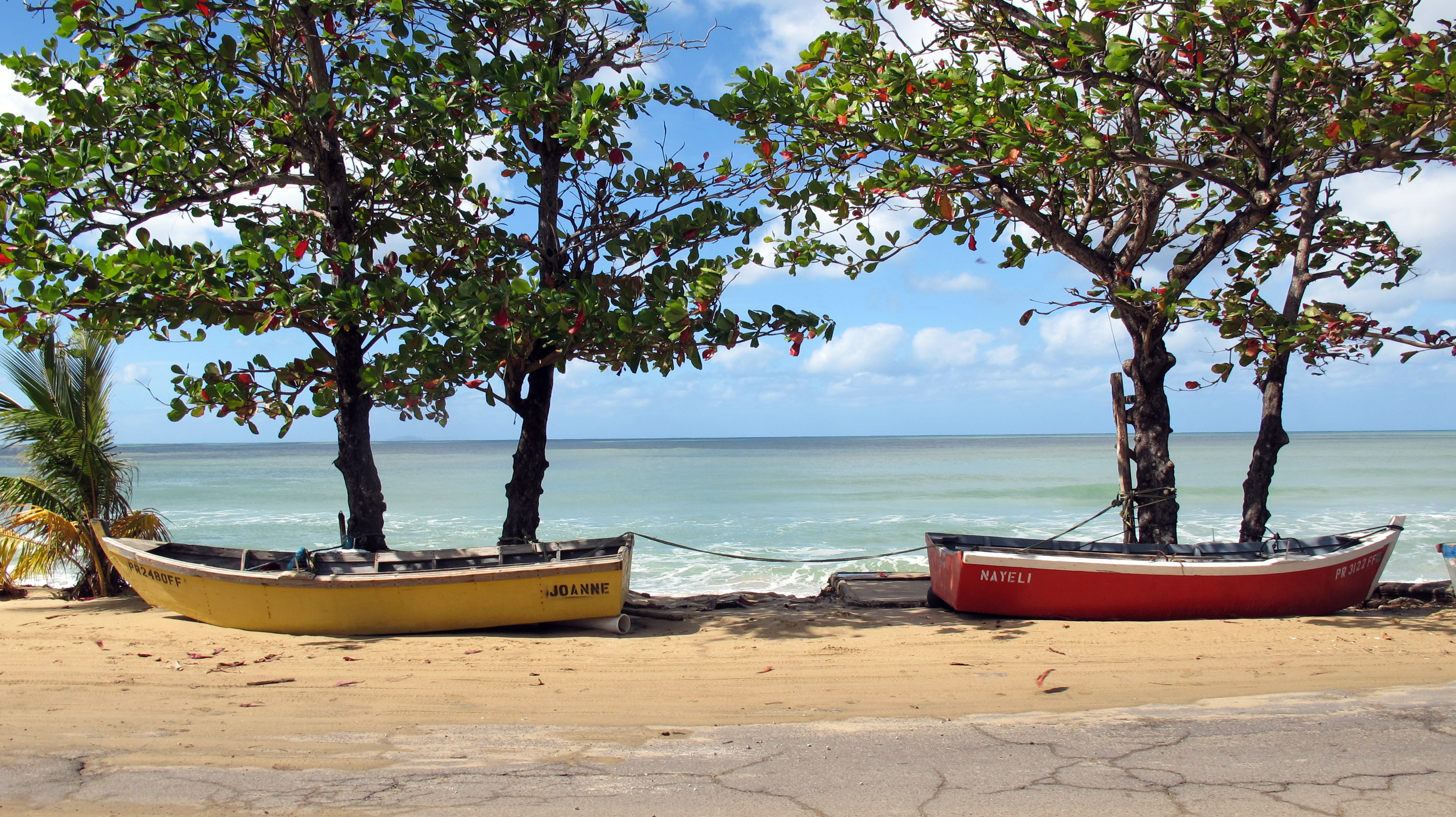
Near Schoolyards Beach

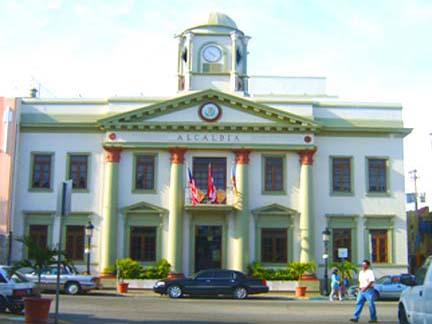
Aguadilla City Hall

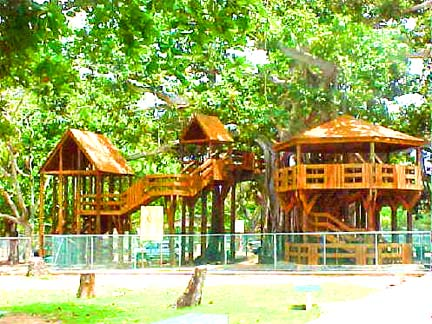
Banyan Treehouse

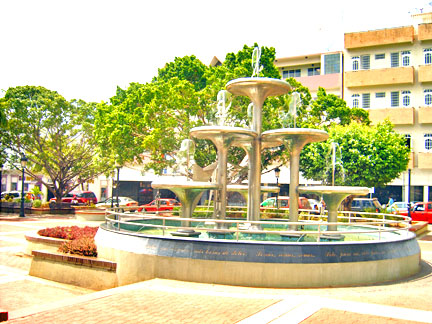
Campanitas de Cristal Fountain

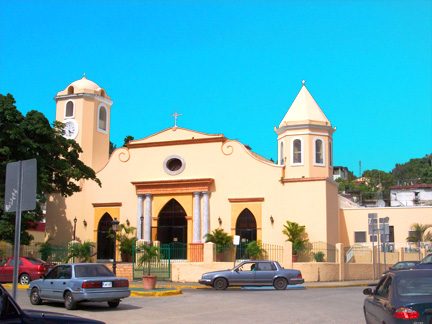
Roman Catholic Parish Church San Carlos Borromeo

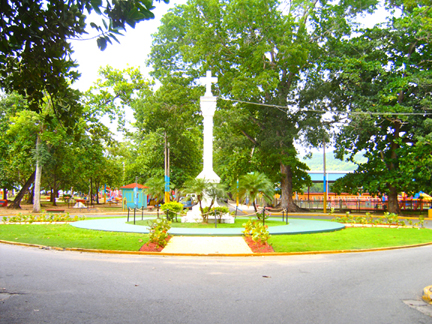
Columbus Cross

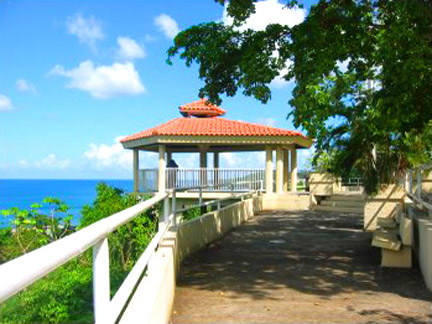
El Merendero

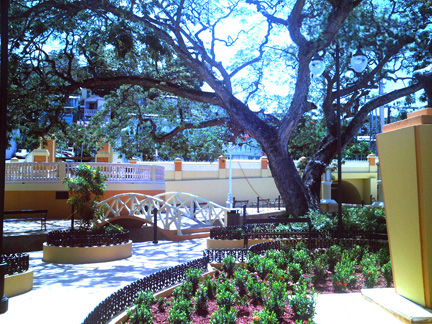
El Parterre

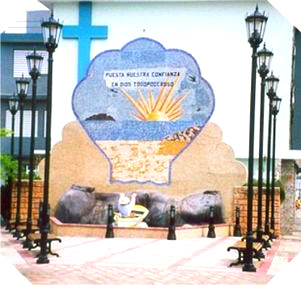
Fisherman's Monument

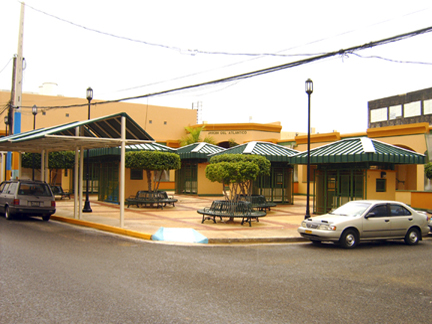
Jardín del Atlántico Sq.

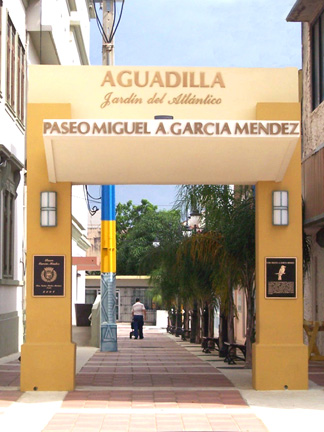
Paseo Miguel García Méndez

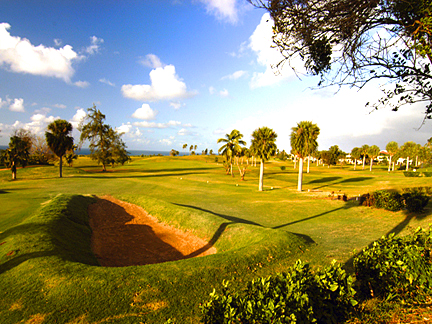
Punta Borinquen Golf Course

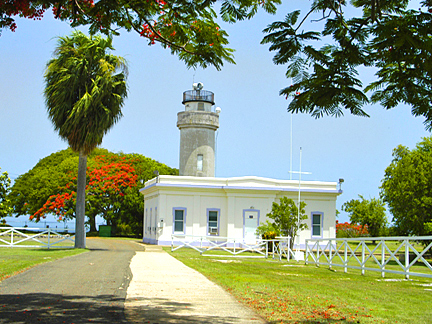
Punta Borinquen Lighthouse

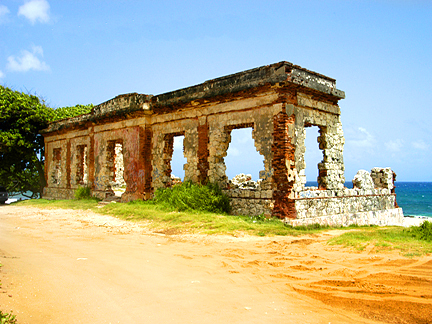
Punta Borinquen Lighthouse Ruins

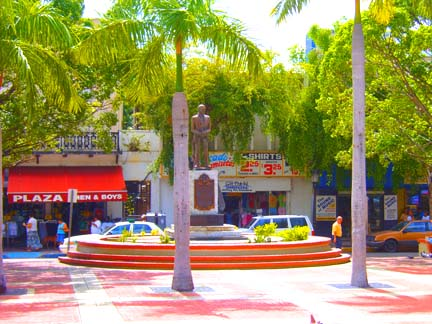
Rafael Hernández Monument

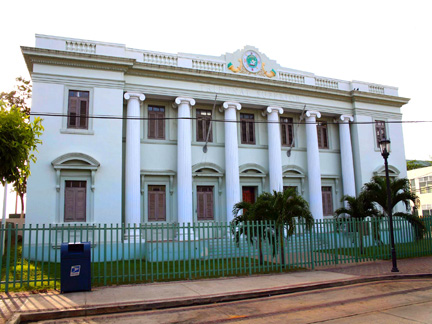
Old Courthouse

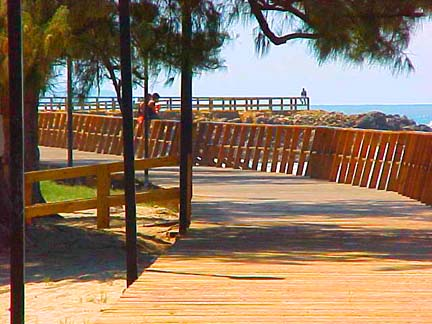
Boardwalk

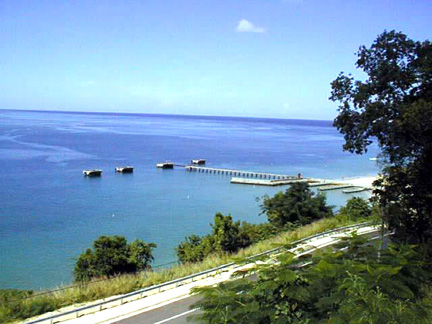
Crash Boat Beach

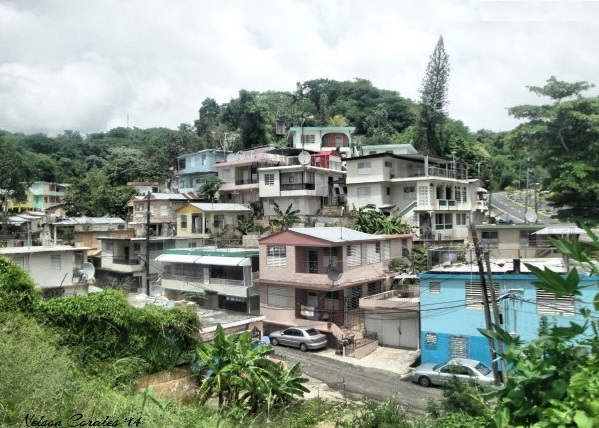
Cerro Echevarría Sector, Aguadilla barrio-pueblo

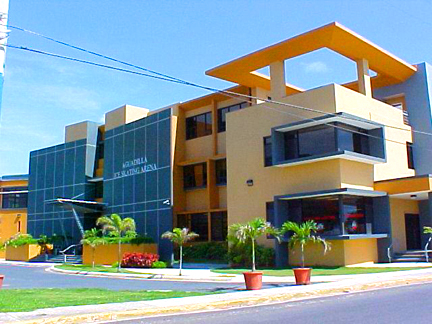
Aguadilla Ice Skating Arena

== See also ==
- History of Puerto Rico
- List of Puerto Ricans
- National Register of Historic Places listings in Aguadilla, Puerto Rico
