= Gas Chambers =

Type of wave, name of beach

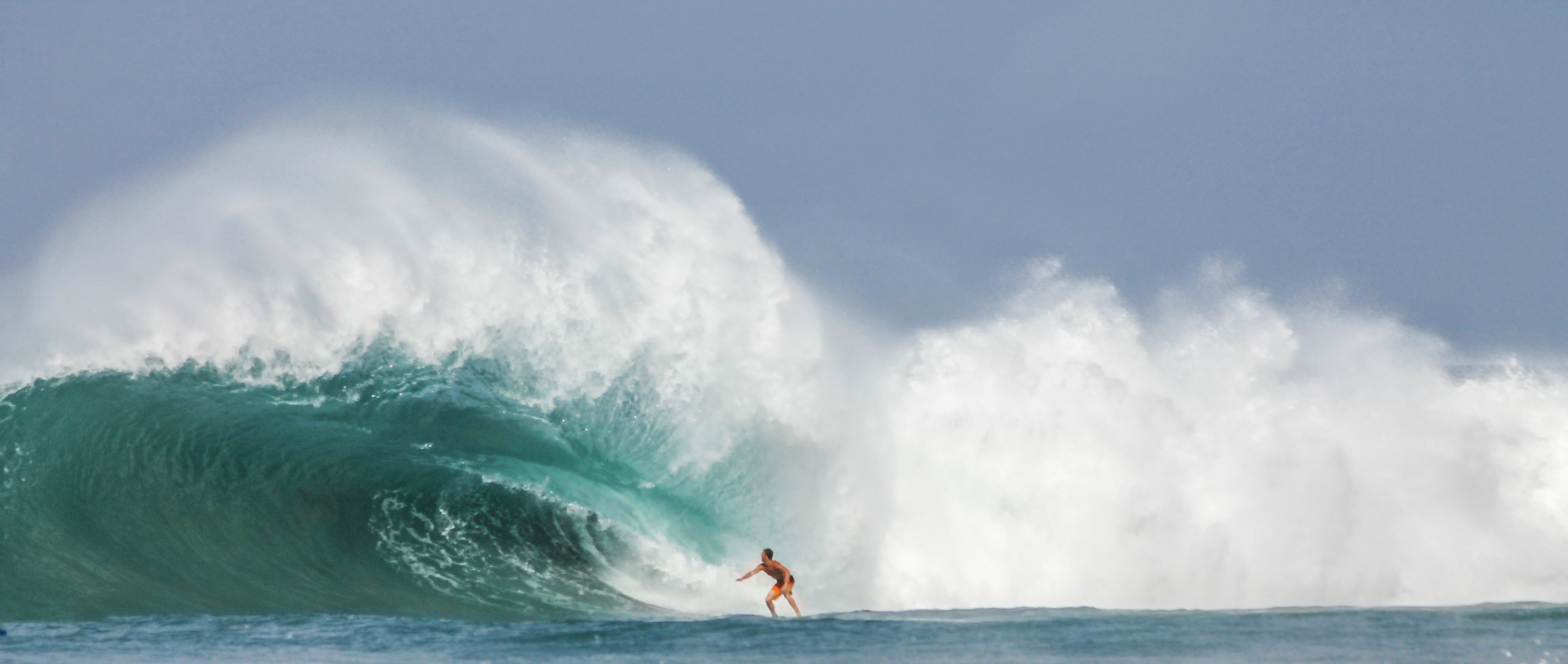
Gas Chambers is also a beach in Aguadilla, Puerto Rico

Gas Chambers is a fast, hollow and shallow point break type of wave. It is a high performance wave that is well-suited for the average to pro level surfer.

Gas Chambers is also a beach located on the North Shore of Oahu about a 1/4 of a mile north of Ehukai Beach Park and 1/2 a mile west of Sunset Beach Park. The easiest way to get there is to start at Ehukai Beach Park and walk north taking the 2nd public right of way to the beach.

There is a Gas Chambers beach in Aguadilla, Puerto Rico with surfable waves in the winter.
