= Puerto Rico Highway 110 =

Highway in Puerto Rico

Highway 110
- Ruta 110

Route information
- Maintained by Puerto Rico DTPW
- Length: 33.0 km (20.5 mi)

Major junctions
- South end: PR-2 in Quebrada Larga
- PR-419 in Cerro Gordo; PR-4417 in Mamey–Marías; PR-125 in Pueblo–Moca barrio-pueblo; PR-111 in Moca barrio-pueblo; PR-462 in Caimital Alto–Centro; PR-464 in Aceitunas; PR-2 in Ceiba Baja–Caimital Alto; PR-465 in Ceiba Baja–Caimital Alto; PR-459 in Arenales–Aguacate; PR-471 in Montaña
- North end: Ramey Air Force Base in Maleza Alta

Location
- Country: United States
- Territory: Puerto Rico
- Municipalities: Añasco, Aguada, Moca, Aguadilla

Highway system
- Roads in Puerto Rico; List
← PR-109	→ PR-111
← PR-25R	PR-110R	→ PR-111R
← PR-3344	PR-4010	→ PR-4025
← PR-4025	PR-4110	→ PR-4111

Puerto Rico Highway 110 (PR-110) is a road that goes from Añasco, Puerto Rico to Aguadilla through Moca. It extends from Puerto Rico Highway 2 north of Añasco to Ramey Air Force Base.

== Major intersections ==
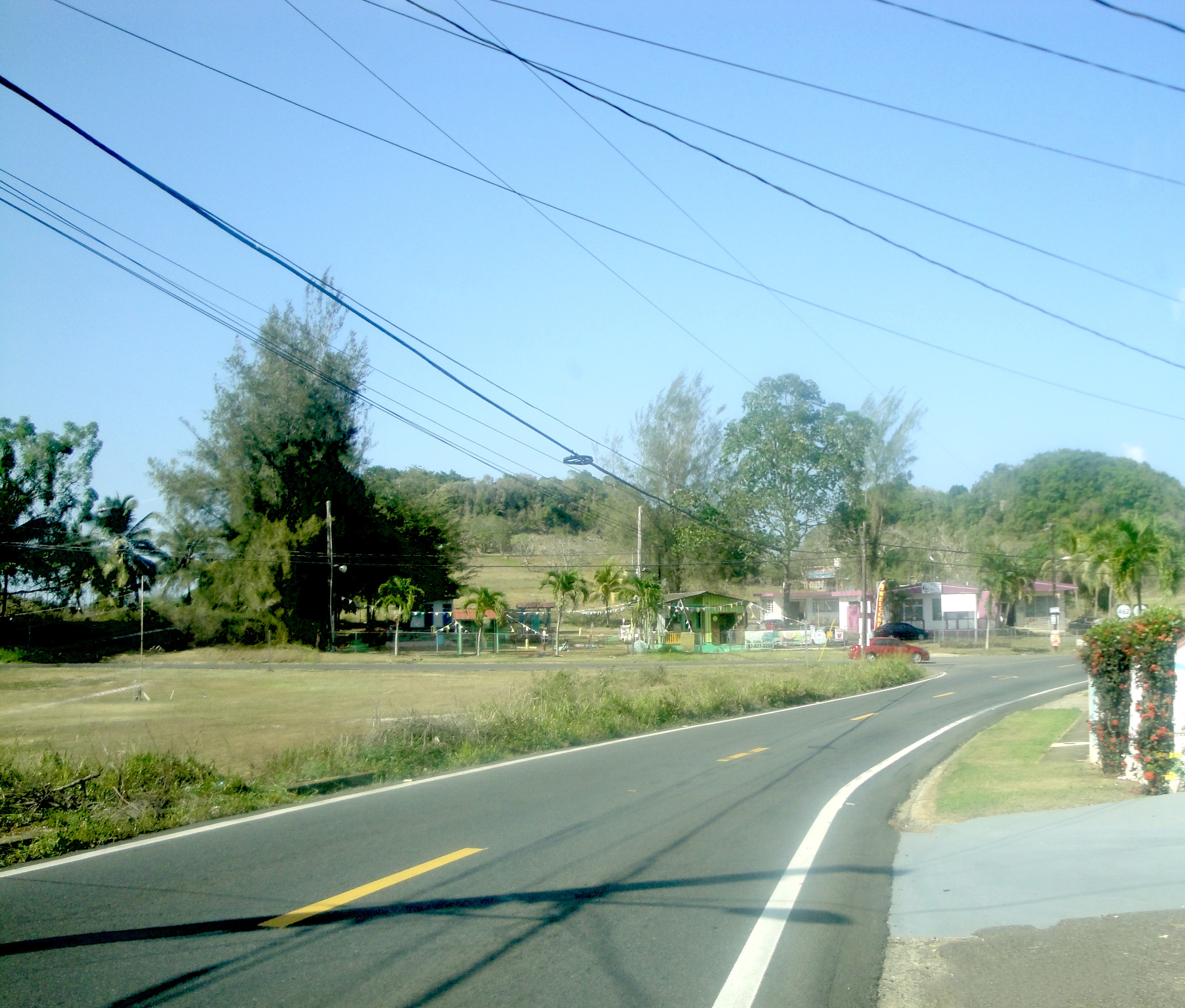
PR-110 and PR-462 between Moca and Aguadilla

Municipality	Location	km	mi	Destinations	Notes
Añasco	Quebrada Larga	0.0	0.0	PR-2 (Expreso Rafael Hernández, "El Jibarito") – Mayagüez, Aguadilla	Southern terminus of PR-110
Aguada–Moca municipal line	Cerro Gordo–Naranjo line	2.3	1.4	PR-4403 – Añasco	
Aguada	Cerro Gordo	4.8	3.0	PR-419 – Cerro Gordo	
Aguada–Moca municipal line	Cerro Gordo–Marías line	5.1	3.2	PR-4419 – Naranjo	
Aguada–Moca municipal line	Mamey–Marías line	8.9	5.5	PR-4417 – Mamey	
Moca	Pueblo	11.7	7.3	PR-4025 (Calle Blanca E. Chico) – Moca	Former PR-110R
Moca	Pueblo–Moca barrio-pueblo line	12.5	7.8	PR-125 (Calle José Celso Barbosa) – Moca, San Sebastián	
Moca	Moca barrio-pueblo	12.7	7.9	PR-111 (Carretera Enrique Laguerre) – Aguadilla, San Sebastián	
Moca	Pueblo	13.3	8.3	PR-4025 (Calle Blanca E. Chico) – Moca	Former PR-110R
Moca	Centro	17.2	10.7	PR-4110 – Caimital Bajo	
Aguadilla–Moca municipal line	Caimital Alto–Centro line	19.8	12.3	PR-462 – Caimital Alto	
Moca	Aceitunas	21.4	13.3	PR-464 – Aceitunas	
Aguadilla	Ceiba Baja	23.1 118.3 (Note: Kilometer markers represent the distance along PR-2 rather than PR-110.)	14.4 73.5	PR-2 east (Carretera José Joaquín "Yiye" Ávila) – Arecibo, San Juan	Eastern terminus of PR-2 concurrency
Aguadilla	Caimital Alto–Ceiba Baja line	119.5 23.2	74.3 14.4	PR-2 west (Carretera José Joaquín "Yiye" Ávila) – Aguadilla, Mayagüez	Western terminus of PR-2 concurrency
Aguadilla	Caimital Alto–Ceiba Baja line	23.3– 23.4	14.5– 14.5	PR-465 – Ceiba Baja	
Aguadilla	Arenales–Aguacate line	27.0	16.8	PR-459 (Carretera Jobos) – Aguadilla, Isabela	
Aguadilla	Aguacate	27.4– 27.5	17.0– 17.1	PR-4010 – Maleza Alta	Former PR-110R
Aguadilla	Montaña	29.3	18.2	PR-471 – San Antonio	
Aguadilla	Montaña	30.2	18.8	PR-4466 – Isabela	
Aguadilla	Maleza Alta	33.0	20.5	PR-Cliff Road / PR-San Antonio Road – Ramey Air Force Base	Northern terminus of PR-110
1.000 mi = 1.609 km; 1.000 km = 0.621 mi: Concurrency terminus

== Related routes ==
Currently, PR-110 has two branches in its old segments in Aguadilla and Moca and it also has another one between the two municipalities.

=== Puerto Rico Highway 110R ===
Highway 110R
- Location: Moca
- Length: 1.5 km (0.93 mi)
- Existed: y

Puerto Rico Highway 110R (Spanish: Carretera Ramal 110, abbreviated Ramal PR-110 or PR-110R) was the old section of PR-110 through downtown Moca. This road can be seen as a Business 110, but currently is renumbered to PR-4025. The entire route is located in Moca.

Location	km	mi	Destinations	Notes
Pueblo	0.0	0.0	PR-110 (Calle Concepción Vera Ayala) – Aguada, Añasco	Southern terminus of PR-110R
Moca barrio-pueblo	1.0	0.62	PR-125 (Calle José Celso Barbosa) – Aguadilla, San Sebastián	One-way street; eastbound access via Calle Don Chemary
Pueblo	1.5	0.93	PR-110 (Calle Concepción Vera Ayala) – Aguadilla, Isabela	Northern terminus of PR-110R
1.000 mi = 1.609 km; 1.000 km = 0.621 mi: Incomplete access

=== Puerto Rico Highway 4010 ===
Highway 4010
- Location: Aguadilla
- Length: 1.4 km (0.87 mi)

Puerto Rico Highway 4010 (PR-4010) is an old segment of PR-110 that provides access to a small residential area between Aguacate and Maleza Alta in Aguadilla. Previously it was identified as PR-110R. The entire route is located in Aguadilla.

Location	km	mi	Destinations	Notes
Aguacate	0.0	0.0	PR-110 (Avenida Miguel Ángel García Méndez) – Aguadilla	Southern terminus of PR-4010
Maleza Alta–Aguacate line	0.7	0.43	PR-468 – Aguadilla	
Maleza Alta	1.4	0.87	[[Puerto Rico Highway Ramey Air Force Base |PR-Ramey Air Force Base]] – Aguadilla	Northern terminus of PR-4010; dead end road
1.000 mi = 1.609 km; 1.000 km = 0.621 mi

=== Puerto Rico Highway 4110 ===
Highway 4110
- Location: Aguadilla – Moca
- Length: 0.9 km (0.56 mi; 3,000 ft)

Puerto Rico Highway 4110 (PR-4110) is a spur route of PR-110 between Moca and Aguadilla. It extends from PR-110 to PR-443.

Municipality	Location	km	mi	Destinations	Notes
Aguadilla	Caimital Bajo–Caimital Alto line	0.9	0.56	PR-443 – Aguadilla	Western terminus of PR-4110
Moca	Centro	0.0	0.0	PR-110 (Carretera Antonio Cabán Vale, "El Topo") – Moca, Isabela	Eastern terminus of PR-4110
1.000 mi = 1.609 km; 1.000 km = 0.621 mi
