= List of highways numbered 110 =

Route 110 or Highway 110 can refer to multiple roads:

== Australia ==
- Nepean Highway
- Bellarine Highway

== Bangladesh ==
- N110

== Brazil ==
- BR-110

== Canada ==
- Manitoba Highway 110
- New Brunswick Route 110
- Prince Edward Island Route 110

== China ==
- China National Highway 110

== Costa Rica ==
- National Route 110

== Croatia ==
- D110 road (Croatia)

== France ==
- A110 autoroute (Under Planning)

== India ==
- NH 110

== Ireland ==
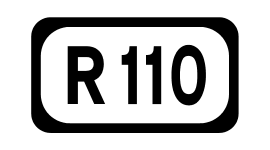
- R110 road (Ireland)

== Korea, South ==
- Second Gyeongin Expressway

== Malaysia ==
- Jalan Kota Baharu (Perak Route A110)
- Jalan Peradin (Johor Route J110)

== Netherlands ==
- S110 (Amsterdam)

== Nigeria ==
- F110 highway (Nigeria)

== Pakistan ==
- N-110 National Highway

== Philippines ==
- N110 highway (Philippines)

== Spain ==
- N-110 road (Spain)

== Turkey ==
- State road D110 (Turkey)

== United Kingdom ==
- A110 road

== United States ==
- Interstate 110 (California)
  - Interstate 110 (California 1958–1968) (former)
- Interstate 110 (Florida)
- Interstate 110 (Louisiana)
- Interstate 110 (Mississippi)
- Interstate 110 (Texas)
- U.S. Route 110 (former)
  - U.S. Route 110 (Indiana–Michigan) (former proposal)
- Alabama State Route 110
  - County Route 110 (Lee County, Alabama)
- Arkansas Highway 110
- California State Route 110
- Colorado State Highway 110
- Connecticut Route 110
- County Road 110 (Duval County, Florida)
- Georgia State Route 110
- Illinois Route 110
  - Illinois Route 110 (1923) (former)
  - Illinois Route 110 (1940s) (former)
- Indiana State Road 110
- Iowa Highway 110
- K-110 (Kansas highway)
- Kentucky Route 110
- Louisiana Highway 110
- Maine State Route 110
- Maryland Route 110 (former)
- Massachusetts Route 110
- M-110 (Michigan highway) (former)
- Minnesota State Highway 110 (former)
- Missouri Route 110
  - Missouri Route 110 (CKC)
- Nebraska Highway 110
- New Hampshire Route 110
  - New Hampshire Route 110A
  - New Hampshire Route 110B
- County Route 110 (Bergen County, New Jersey)
  - County Route S110 (Bergen County, New Jersey)
- New Mexico State Road 110
- New York State Route 110
  - County Route 110 (Dutchess County, New York)
  - County Route 110 (Fulton County, New York)
  - County Route 110 (Nassau County, New York)
  - County Route 110 (Niagara County, New York)
  - County Route 110 (Rockland County, New York)
  - County Route 110 (Saratoga County, New York)
  - County Route 110 (Seneca County, New York)
  - County Route 110 (Suffolk County, New York)
  - County Route 110 (Tompkins County, New York)
  - County Route 110 (Wayne County, New York)
- North Carolina Highway 110
- Ohio State Route 110
- Oklahoma State Highway 110
- Pennsylvania Route 110
- Rhode Island Route 110
- South Carolina Highway 110
- Tennessee State Route 110
- Texas State Highway 110
  - Texas State Highway Loop 110
  - Farm to Market Road 110
- Utah State Route 110
- Vermont Route 110
- Virginia State Route 110
  - Virginia State Route 110 (1928-1933) (former)
  - Virginia State Route 110 (1933-1946) (former)
  - Virginia State Route 110 (1947-1956) (former)
- Washington State Route 110
  - Washington State Route 110 (1967) (former)
- Wisconsin Highway 110
- Wyoming Highway 110

Territories

- Puerto Rico Highway 110
  - Puerto Rico Highway 110R (former)

== See also ==
- A110
- B110
- D110 road
- P110

Preceded by 109	Lists of highways 110	Succeeded by 111
