= Puerto Rico Highway 462 =

Highway in Puerto Rico

Highway 462
- Ruta 462

Route information
- Maintained by Puerto Rico DTPW
- Length: 2.41 km (1.50 mi)

Major junctions
- West end: PR-2 / PR-463 in Corrales–Caimital Alto
- East end: PR-110 in Caimital Alto–Centro

Location
- Country: United States
- Territory: Puerto Rico
- Municipalities: Aguadilla, Moca

Highway system
- Roads in Puerto Rico; List
← PR-438	→ PR-487

Puerto Rico Highway 462 (PR-462) is an east–west road between the municipalities of Aguadilla and Moca in Puerto Rico. With a length of 2.41 kilometers (1.50 mi), it begins at its intersection with PR-2 and PR-463 on the Corrales–Caimital Alto line in Aguadilla, and ends at its junction with PR-110 on the Aguadilla–Moca municipal line.

== Major intersections ==
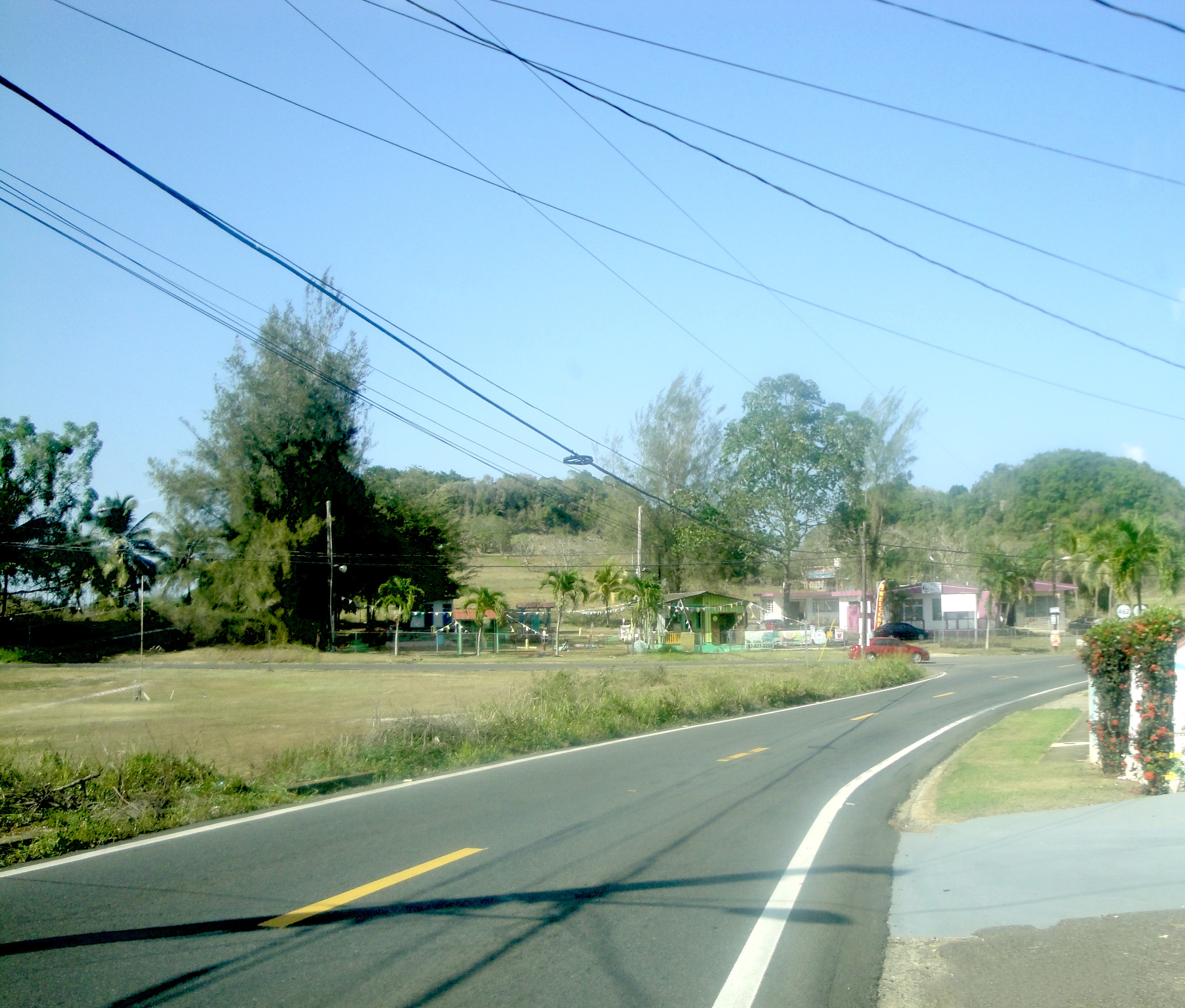
PR-110 and PR-462 between Moca and Aguadilla

Municipality	Location	km	mi	Destinations	Notes
Aguadilla	Corrales–Caimital Alto line	0.00	0.00	PR-2 (Carretera José Joaquín "Yiye" Ávila) / PR-463 – Aguadilla, Isabela	Western terminus of PR-462; no access across PR-2
Aguadilla–Moca municipal line	Caimital Alto–Centro line	2.41	1.50	PR-110 (Carretera Antonio Cabán Vale, "El Topo") – Moca, Isabela	Eastern terminus of PR-462
1.000 mi = 1.609 km; 1.000 km = 0.621 mi: Incomplete access
