= List of highways numbered 112 =

The following roads are numbered 112:

== Brazil ==
- PA-112

== Canada ==
- New Brunswick Route 112
- Ontario Highway 112
- Prince Edward Island Route 112
- Quebec Route 112

== China ==
- China National Highway 112

== Costa Rica ==
- National Route 112

== Cuba ==
- Santa Clara–Cienfuegos Road (4–112)

== India ==
- National Highway 112 (India)

== Japan ==
- Route 112 (Japan)

== Nigeria ==
- F112 highway (Nigeria)

== Philippines ==
- N112 highway (Philippines)

== United Kingdom ==
- A112 road
- B112 road.

== United States ==
- U.S. Route 112 (former)
  - U.S. Route 112 (Wisconsin) (former proposal)
- Alabama State Route 112 (former)
  - County Route 112 (Lee County, Alabama)
- Arkansas Highway 112
- California State Route 112, a state highway signed as part of California State Route 61 along with SR 260.
- Colorado State Highway 112
- Connecticut Route 112
- Florida State Road 112
- Georgia State Route 112
- Indiana State Road 112 (former)
- K-112 (Kansas highway)
- Kentucky Route 112
- Louisiana Highway 112
- Maine State Route 112
- Maryland Route 112
- Massachusetts Route 112
- M-112 (Michigan highway), runs concurrently with Interstate 94 for its route.
- Minnesota State Highway 112 (former)
- Missouri Route 112
- Nebraska Highway 112
- New Hampshire Route 112
- County Route 112 (Bergen County, New Jersey)
- New Mexico State Road 112
- New York State Route 112
  - County Route 112 (Fulton County, New York)
  - County Route 112 (Niagara County, New York)
  - County Route 112 (Rockland County, New York)
  - County Route 112 (Suffolk County, New York)
  - County Route 112 (Sullivan County, New York)
  - County Route 112 (Wayne County, New York)
  - County Route 112 (Westchester County, New York)
- North Carolina Highway 112
- Ohio State Route 112 (former)
- Oklahoma State Highway 112
- Pennsylvania Route 112 (former)
- Rhode Island Route 112
- Tennessee State Route 112
- Texas State Highway 112
  - Farm to Market Road 112
- Utah State Route 112
- Vermont Route 112
- Virginia State Route 112
  - Virginia State Route 112 (1923-1928) (former)
  - Virginia State Route 112 (1928-1933) (former)
  - Virginia State Route 112 (1933-1943) (former)
- Washington State Route 112
- West Virginia Route 112
- Wisconsin Highway 112
- Wyoming Highway 112

Territories

- Puerto Rico Highway 112

== See also ==
- List of highways numbered 112S
- A112 road
- D112 road
- P112
- R112 road (Ireland)
- S112 (Amsterdam)

Preceded by 111	Lists of highways 112	Succeeded by 113
