= Route 112 (disambiguation) =

Route 112 may refer to:

- Route 112 (MBTA)
- London Buses route 112
- Melbourne tram route 112

== See also ==
- List of highways numbered 112
