= Ceiba Baja, Aguadilla, Puerto Rico =

Barrio of Puerto Rico

Ceiba Baja
- Barrio
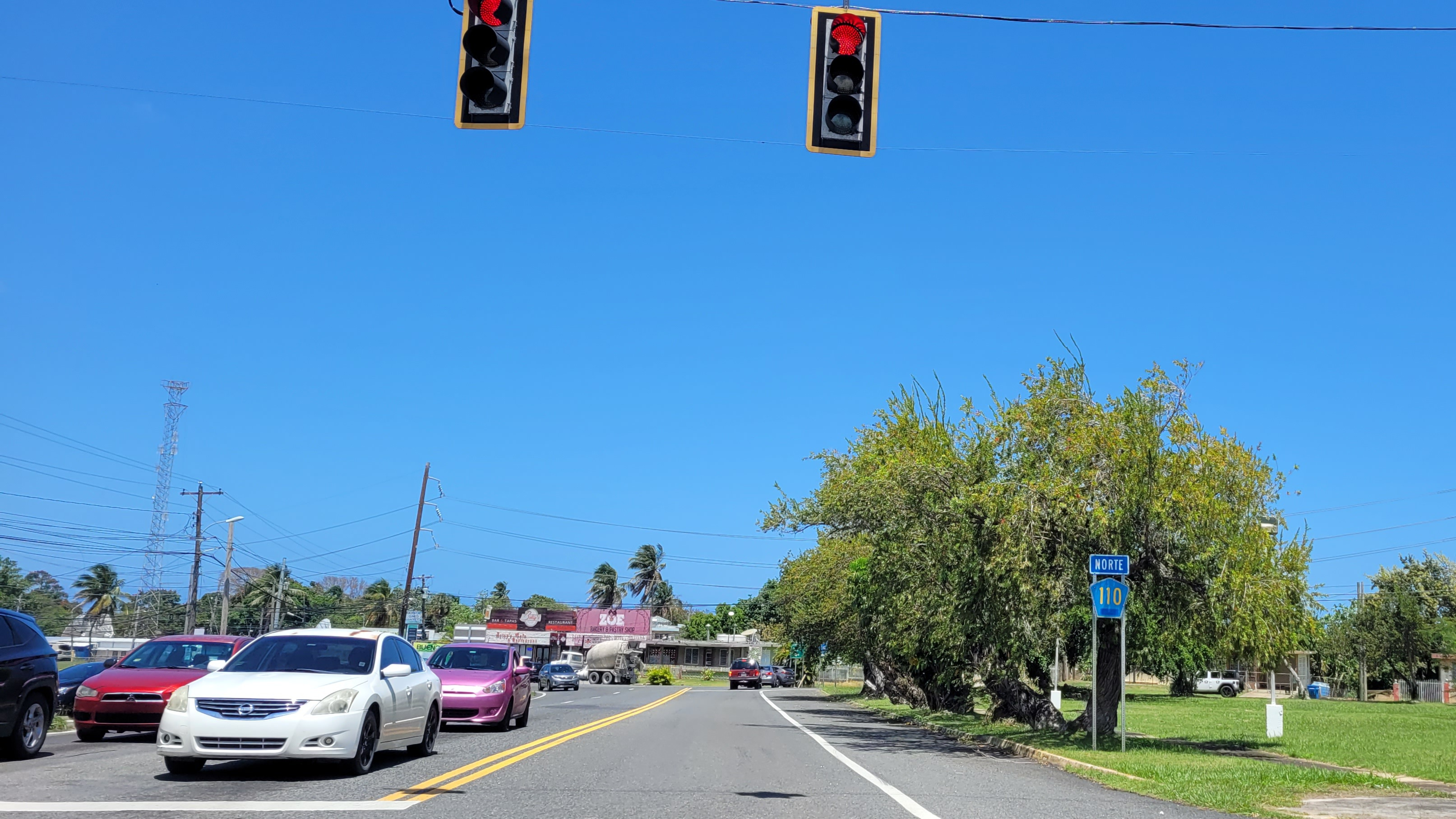
- Puerto Rico Highway 110 between Ceiba Baja and Caimital Alto

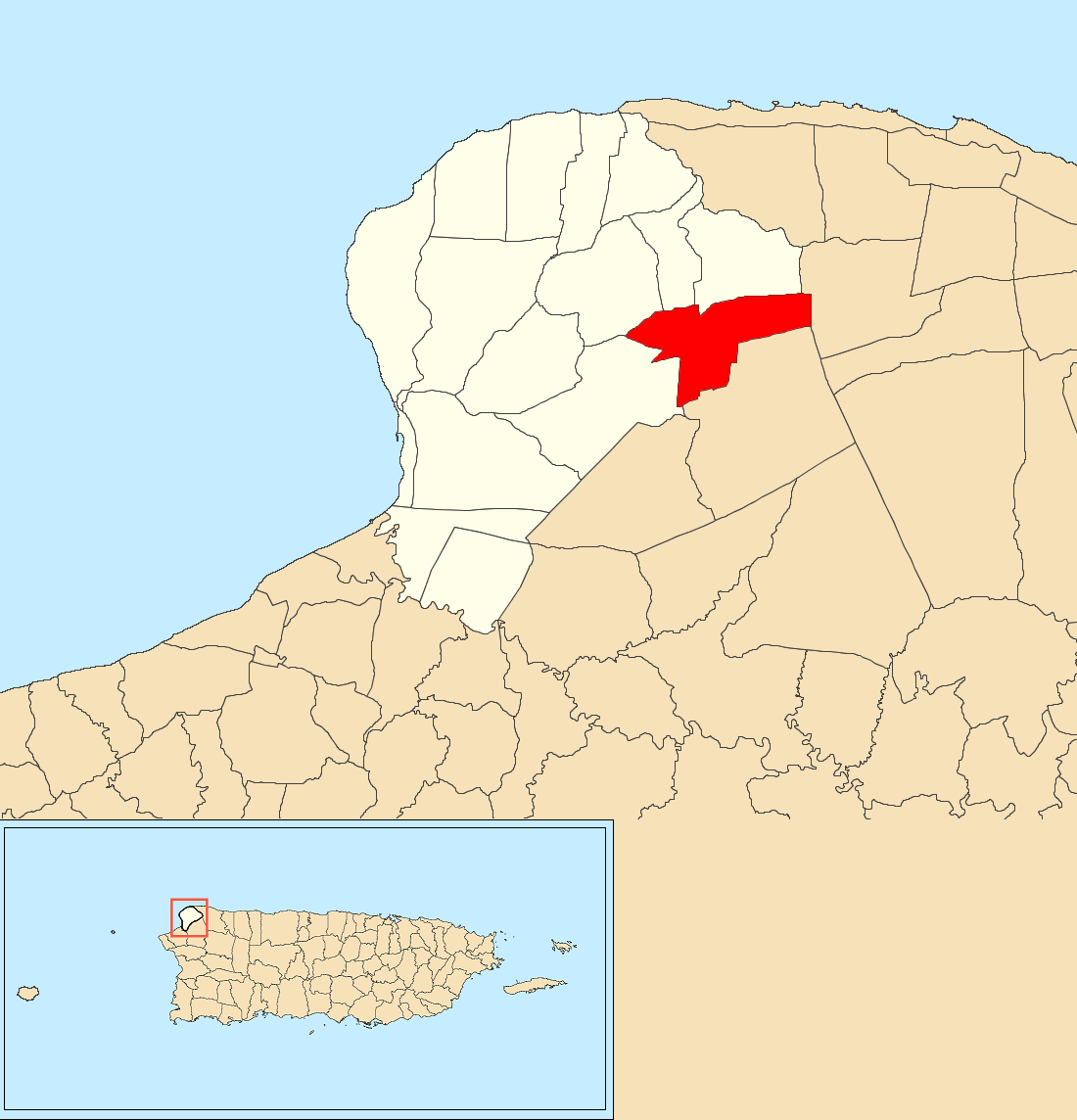

- Location of Puerto Rico
- Coordinates: 18°27′35″N 67°04′51″W
- Commonwealth: Puerto Rico
- Municipality: Aguadilla

Area
  - Total: 2.53 sq mi (6.6 km^{2})
  - Land: 2.53 sq mi (6.6 km^{2})
  - Water: 0.00 sq mi (0 km^{2})
- Elevation: 433 ft (132 m)

Population (2010)
  - Total: 2,356
  - Density: 934.9/sq mi (361.0/km^{2})
- Source: 2010 Census
- Time zone: UTC−4 (AST)

Ceiba Baja is a rural barrio in the municipality of Aguadilla, Puerto Rico. Its population in 2010 was 2,356.

== History ==
Ceiba Baja was in Spain's gazetteers until Puerto Rico was ceded by Spain in the aftermath of the Spanish–American War under the terms of the Treaty of Paris of 1898 and became an unincorporated territory of the United States. In 1899, the United States Department of War conducted a census of Puerto Rico finding that the combined population of Ceiba Alta and Ceiba Baja barrios was 1,033.

Historical population
Census	Pop.	Note	%±
1910	2,341		—
1920	1,993		−14.9%
1930	1,701		−14.7%
1940	1,188		−30.2%
1950	1,409		18.6%
1960	1,166		−17.2%
1970	952		−18.4%
1980	1,380		45.0%
1990	1,821		32.0%
2000	2,420		32.9%
2010	2,356		−2.6%
U.S. Decennial Census; 1900 (N/A) 1910-1930; 1930-1950 1980-2000 2010

== Sectors ==
Barrios (which are, in contemporary times, roughly comparable to minor civil divisions) in turn are further subdivided into smaller local populated place areas/units called sectores (sectors in English). The types of sectores may vary, from normally sector to urbanización to reparto to barriada to residencial, among others.

The following sectors are in Ceiba Baja barrio:

Carretera Sanders, Paseos de Aguadilla, Reparto Apolo, Reparto González, Reparto Riollano, Reparto Santa María, Reparto Villa Grajales, Sector Angelito Cruz, Sector Herrera, Sector Los Posada, Sector Monte Cristo, Sector Paseo del Paraíso, Sector Villa Damasco, Sector Sotomayor, Urbanización Atlantic View, Urbanización Estancias Barreto, Urbanización Jardines de Versalles, Urbanización Quintas de Monterey, Urbanización Villa Esperanza, and Urbanización Villas del Rey.

== Gallery ==
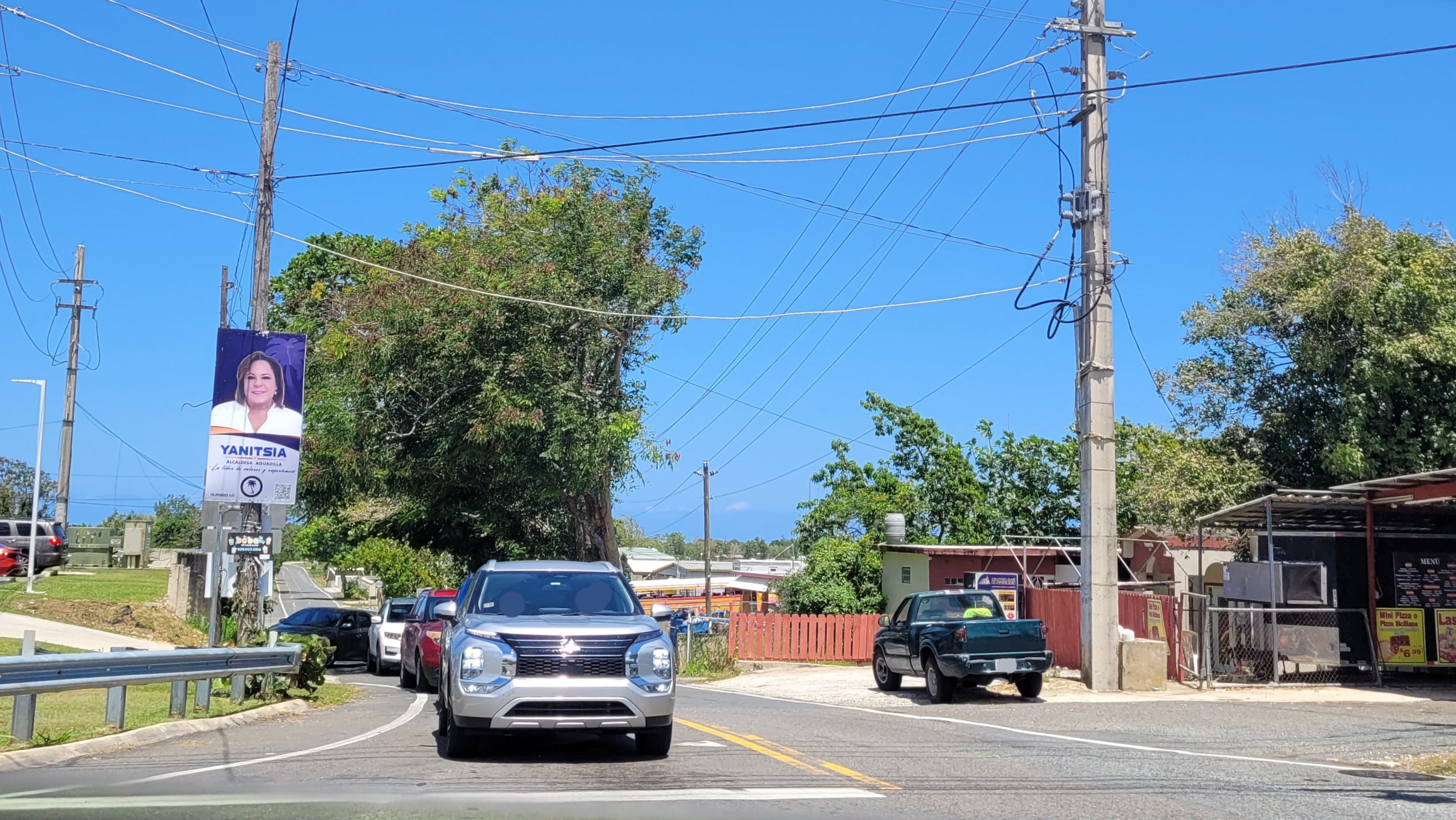
Puerto Rico Highway 466 in Ceiba Baja

== See also ==
- List of communities in Puerto Rico
- List of barrios and sectors of Aguadilla, Puerto Rico
