= SR111 =

SR111 may refer to:

- List of highways numbered 111
- Swissair Flight 111
