= List of highways numbered 111 =

The following roads are numbered 111:

== Canada ==
- New Brunswick Route 111
- Nova Scotia Highway 111
- Prince Edward Island Route 111
- Quebec Route 111

== Costa Rica ==
- National Route 111

== Cuba ==
- Pinar del Río–Guane Road (1-111)

== Germany ==
- Bundesautobahn 111

== Greece ==
- Greek National Road 111 (1928–1955)

== Nigeria ==
- F111 highway (Nigeria)

== Philippines ==
- N111 highway (Philippines)

== United Kingdom ==
- A111 road
- B111 road

== United States ==
- U.S. Route 111 (former)
- Alabama State Route 111
- Arkansas Highway 111
- California State Route 111
- Connecticut Route 111
- Florida State Road 111
- Georgia State Route 111
- Illinois Route 111
- Indiana State Road 111
- K-111 (Kansas highway)
- Kentucky Route 111
- Louisiana Highway 111
- Maine State Route 111
- Massachusetts Route 111
- M-111 (Michigan highway) (former)
- Minnesota State Highway 111
- Missouri Route 111
  - Missouri Route 111 (1929) (former)
- Nebraska Highway 111 (former)
- New Hampshire Route 111
  - New Hampshire Route 111A
- County Route 111 (Bergen County, New Jersey)
  - County Route 111 (Ocean County, New Jersey)
- New Mexico State Road 111
- New York State Route 111
  - County Route 111 (Albany County, New York)
  - County Route 111 (Cortland County, New York)
  - County Route 111 (Dutchess County, New York)
  - County Route 111 (Erie County, New York)
  - County Route 111 (Fulton County, New York)
  - County Route 111 (Jefferson County, New York)
  - County Route 111 (Niagara County, New York)
  - County Route 111 (Steuben County, New York)
  - County Route 111 (Suffolk County, New York)
  - County Route 111 (Sullivan County, New York)
- North Carolina Highway 111
- Ohio State Route 111
- Tennessee State Route 111
- Texas State Highway 111
  - Texas State Highway Loop 111
  - Texas State Highway Spur 111 (former)
- Farm to Market Road 111
- Utah State Route 111
- Vermont Route 111
- Virginia State Route 111
  - Virginia State Route 111 (1923-1928) (former)
  - Virginia State Route 111 (1928-1933) (former)
- Washington State Route 111 (former)
- Wisconsin Highway 111
- Wyoming Highway 111

Territories

- Puerto Rico Highway 111
  - Puerto Rico Highway 111R (former)

== See also ==
- A111
- Bundesstraße 111
- D111 road
- China National Highway 111
- P111
- R111 road (Ireland)
- S111 (Amsterdam)

Preceded by 110	Lists of highways 111	Succeeded by 112
