= Quebrada Larga, Añasco, Puerto Rico =

Barrio of Puerto Rico

Quebrada Larga
- Barrio
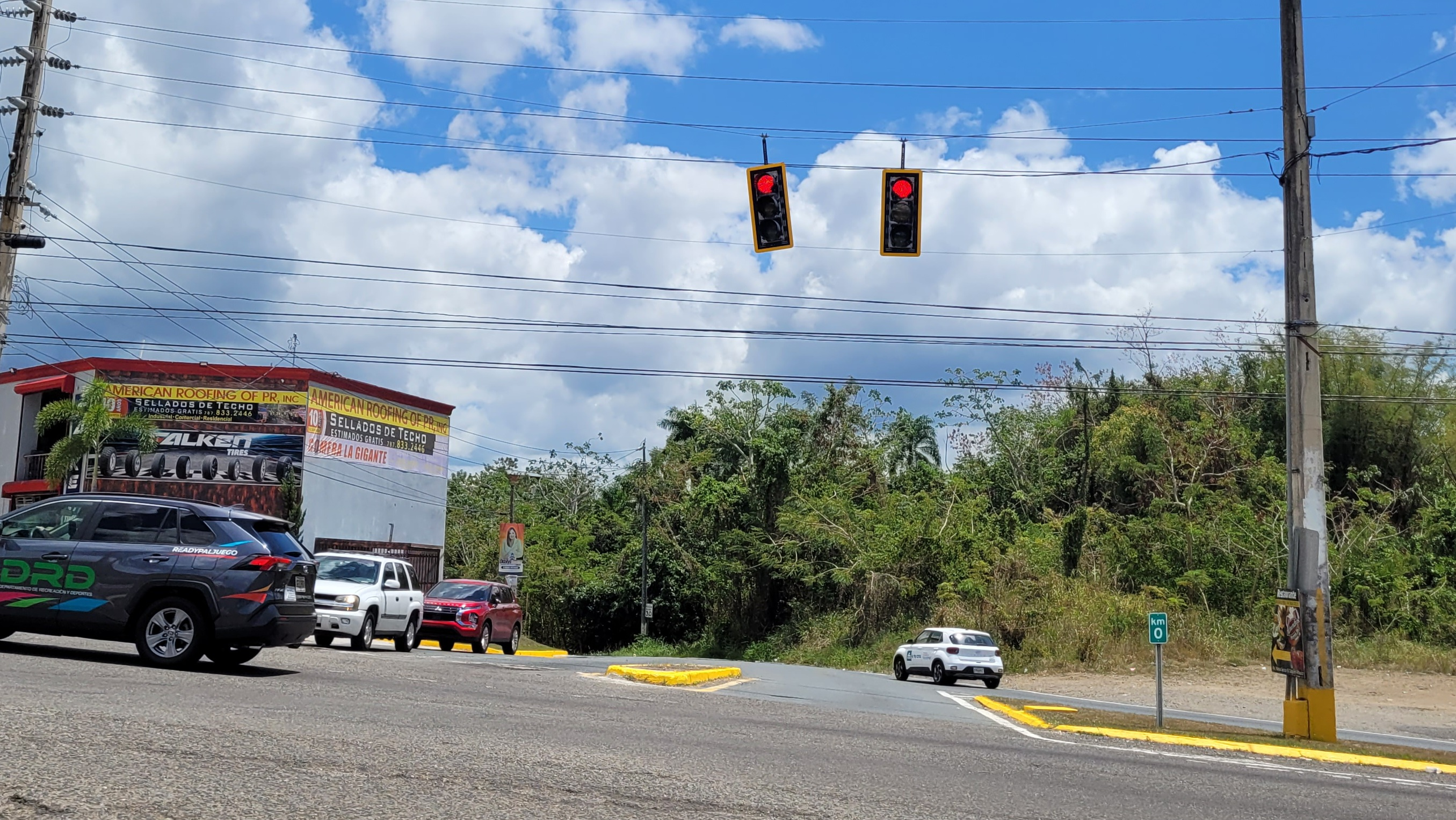
- Puerto Rico Highway 110 in Quebrada Larga

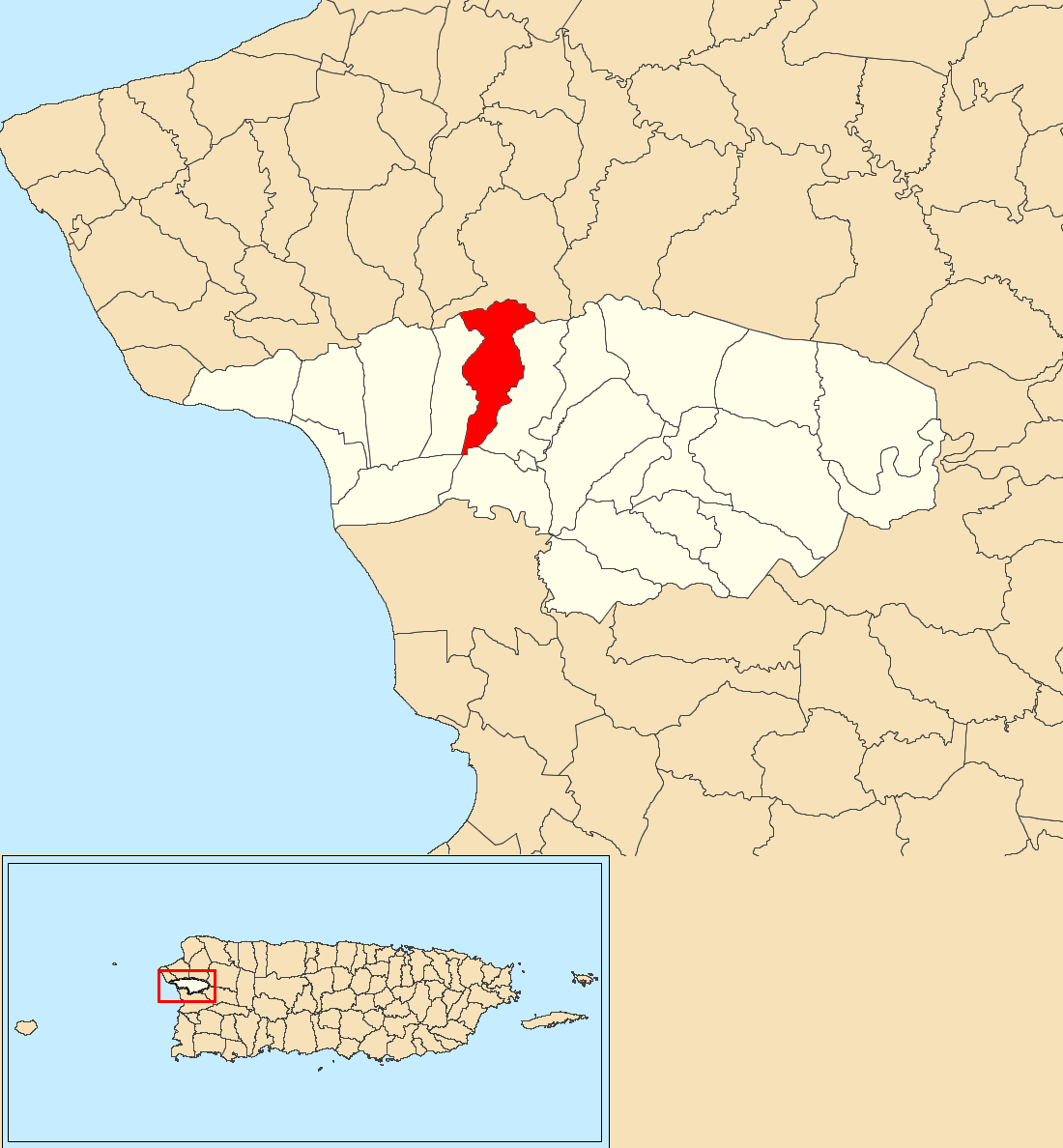
- Location of Quebrada Larga within the municipality of Añasco shown in red

- Location of Puerto Rico
- Coordinates: 18°18′25″N 67°08′57″W
- Commonwealth: Puerto Rico
- Municipality: Añasco

Area
  - Total: 1.61 sq mi (4.2 km^{2})
  - Land: 1.61 sq mi (4.2 km^{2})
  - Water: 0.00 sq mi (0 km^{2})
- Elevation: 246 ft (75 m)

Population (2010)
  - Total: 1,532
  - Density: 951.6/sq mi (367.4/km^{2})
- Source: 2010 Census
- Time zone: UTC−4 (AST)

Quebrada Larga is a barrio in the municipality of Añasco, Puerto Rico. Its population in 2010 was 1,532.

== History ==
Quebrada Larga was in Spain's gazetteers until Puerto Rico was ceded by Spain in the aftermath of the Spanish–American War under the terms of the Treaty of Paris of 1898 and became an unincorporated territory of the United States. In 1899, the United States Department of War conducted a census of Puerto Rico finding that the combined population of Quebrada Larga and Marías barrios was 923.

Historical population
Census	Pop.	Note	%±
1910	488		—
1920	452		−7.4%
1930	432		−4.4%
1940	504		16.7%
1950	609		20.8%
1960	673		10.5%
1970	797		18.4%
1980	898		12.7%
1990	1,241		38.2%
2000	1,506		21.4%
2010	1,532		1.7%
U.S. Decennial Census; 1900 (N/A) 1910-1930; 1930-1950 1980-2000 2010

== Sectors ==
Barrios (which are, in contemporary times, roughly comparable to minor civil divisions) in turn are further subdivided into smaller local populated place areas/units called sectores (sectors in English). The types of sectores may vary, from normally sector to urbanización to reparto to barriada to residencial, among others.

The following sectors are in Quebrada Larga barrio:

Barrio Quebrada Larga Arriba (Sector La Cadena), Sector Sierra Maestra, and Urbanización Estancias de Sierra Maestra.

== See also ==
- List of communities in Puerto Rico
- List of barrios and sectors of Añasco, Puerto Rico
