= Marías, Añasco, Puerto Rico =

Barrio of Puerto Rico

Marías
- Barrio
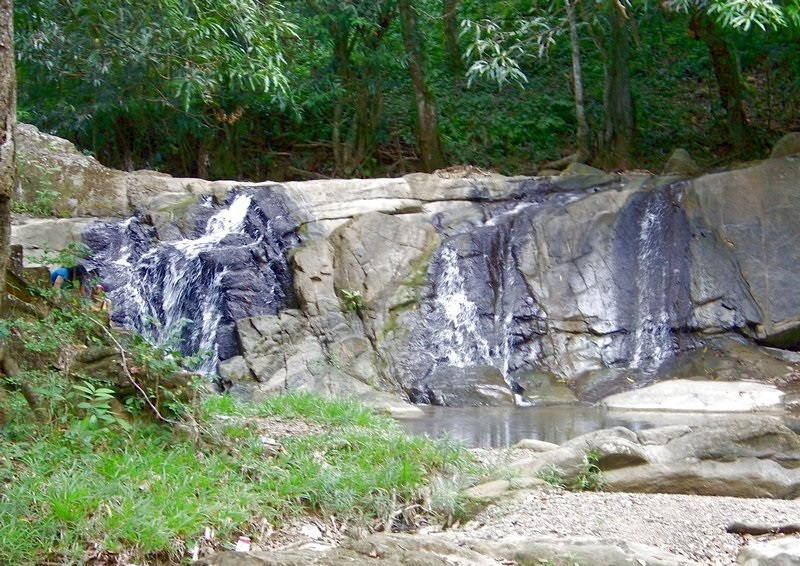
- El salto de la encantada in Marías

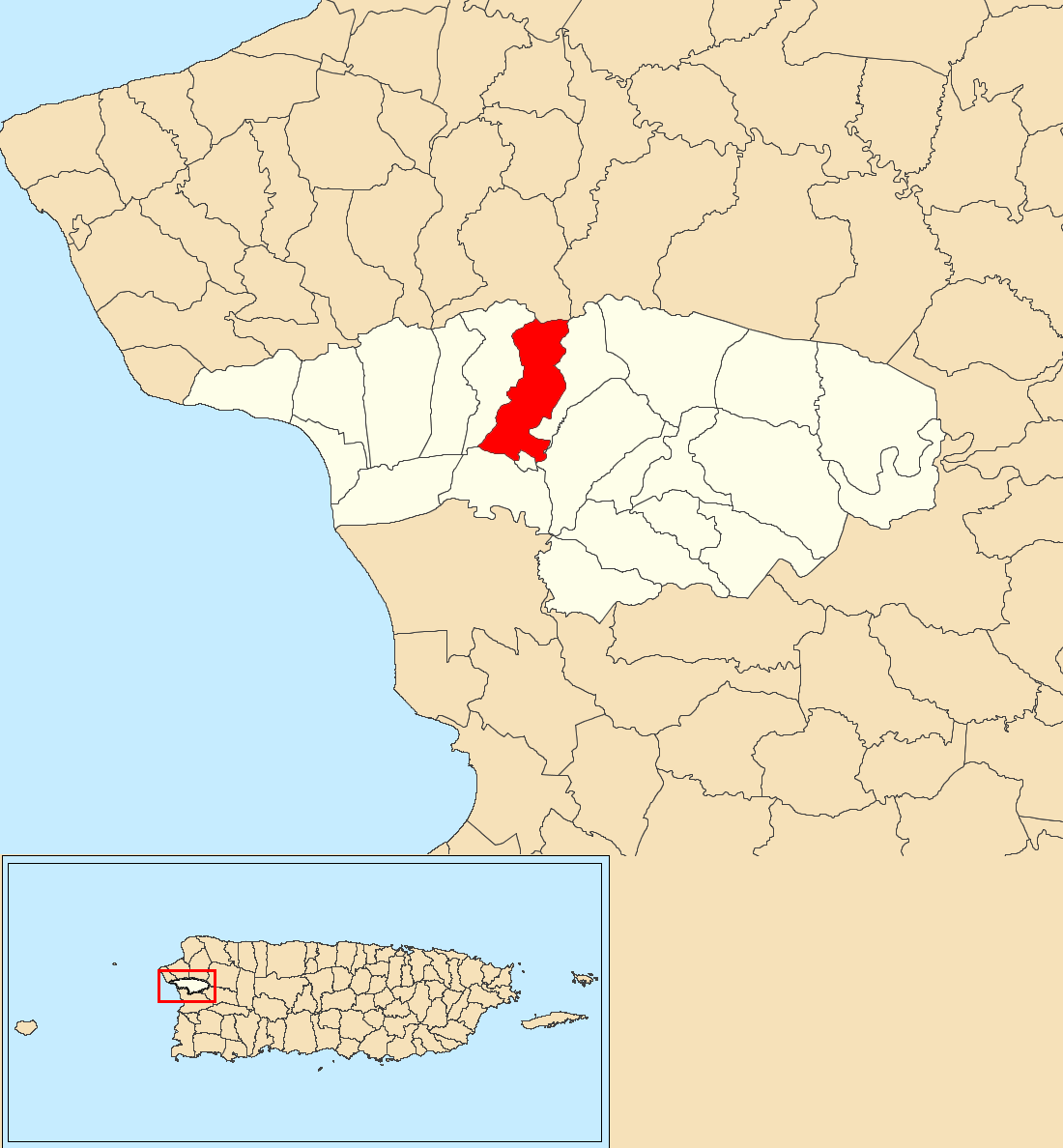
- Location of Marías within the municipality of Añasco shown in red

- Location of Puerto Rico
- Coordinates: 18°18′01″N 67°08′27″W
- Commonwealth: Puerto Rico
- Municipality: Añasco

Area
  - Total: 1.76 sq mi (4.6 km^{2})
  - Land: 1.76 sq mi (4.6 km^{2})
  - Water: 0.00 sq mi (0 km^{2})
- Elevation: 259 ft (79 m)

Population (2010)
  - Total: 4,658
  - Density: 2,646.6/sq mi (1,021.9/km^{2})
- Source: 2010 Census
- Time zone: UTC−4 (AST)

Marías is a barrio in the municipality of Añasco, Puerto Rico. Its population in 2010 was 4,658.

== Features ==
El salto de la encantada is a waterfall located in Marías. Legend has it that an indigenous woman was enchanted with a Spaniard but saddened when a relationship never developed between them. The waterfall is where the woman comes to comb her hair at night and if a visitor is there at 12 midnight, she will speak of, and give the visitor a talisman against, unrequited love.

== History ==
Marías was in Spain's gazetteers until Puerto Rico was ceded by Spain in the aftermath of the Spanish–American War under the terms of the Treaty of Paris of 1898 and became an unincorporated territory of the United States. In 1899, the United States Department of War conducted a census of Puerto Rico finding that the combined population of Marías and Quebrada Larga barrios was 923.

Historical population
Census	Pop.	Note	%±
1910	484		—
1920	655		35.3%
1930	608		−7.2%
1940	817		34.4%
1950	858		5.0%
1960	2,138		149.2%
1970	0		−100.0%
1980	4,855		—
1990	4,196		−13.6%
2000	4,498		7.2%
2010	4,658		3.6%
U.S. Decennial Census; 1900 (N/A) 1910-1930; 1930-1950 1980-2000 2010

== Sectors ==
Barrios (which are, in contemporary times, roughly comparable to minor civil divisions) in turn are further subdivided into smaller local populated place areas/units called sectores (sectors in English). The types of sectores may vary, from normally sector to urbanización to reparto to barriada to residencial, among others.

The following sectors are in Marías barrio:

Barrio Marías Arriba, Carretera 402, Extensión Los Flamboyanes, Parcelas Marías, Sector El Salto, Sector La Variante, Sector Valle Hermoso, Urbanización Jardines de la Encantada, and Urbanización Valle Real.

== See also ==
- List of communities in Puerto Rico
- List of barrios and sectors of Añasco, Puerto Rico
