= List of barrios and sectors of Aguadilla, Puerto Rico =

Like all municipalities of Puerto Rico, Aguadilla is subdivided into administrative units called barrios, which are, in contemporary times, roughly comparable to minor civil divisions. The barrios and subbarrios, in turn, are further subdivided into smaller local populated place areas/units called sectores (sectors in English). The types of sectores may vary, from normally sector to urbanización to reparto to barriada to residencial, among others. Some sectors appear in two barrios.

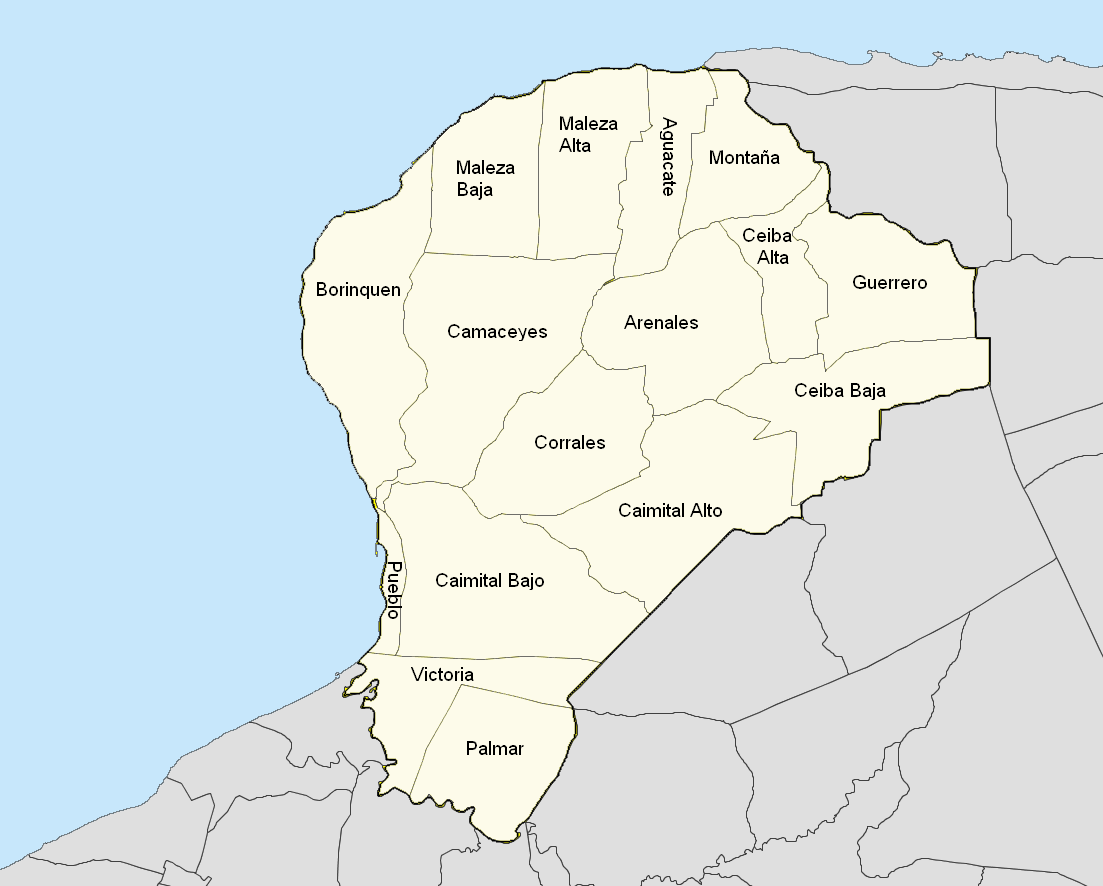
Aguadilla map with barrio subdivisions

== List of sectors by barrio ==
=== Aguacate ===
- Reparto Los Robles
- Reparto Roldán
- Sector Calero
- Sector Villa Min
- Urbanización Nuevo San Antonio
- Urbanización Quintas de San José
- Urbanización Ramón Marín
- Urbanización Villa Aurelia
- Urbanización Villa del Paraíso
- Urbanización Villa Jiménez
- Urbanización Villa Montaña
- Urbanización Villa Sotomayor
- Urbanización Villas del Mar
- Villa Olga

=== Aguadilla barrio-pueblo ===
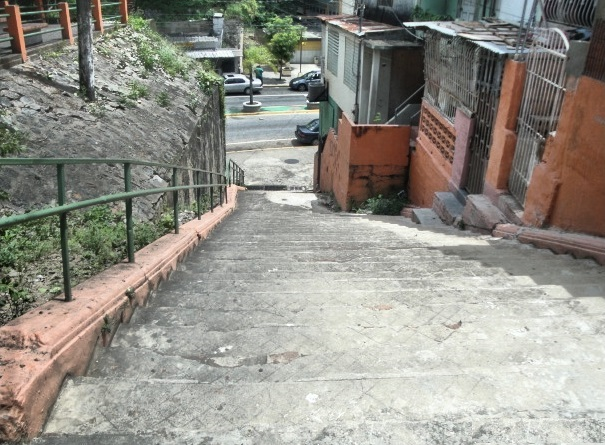
Stairs leading to La Vía Sector in Aguadilla barrio-pueblo

Although Aguadilla officially consists of only one single barrio-pueblo, it is traditionally subdivided into two areas or subbarrios:

==== Barrio Pueblo (Norte) ====
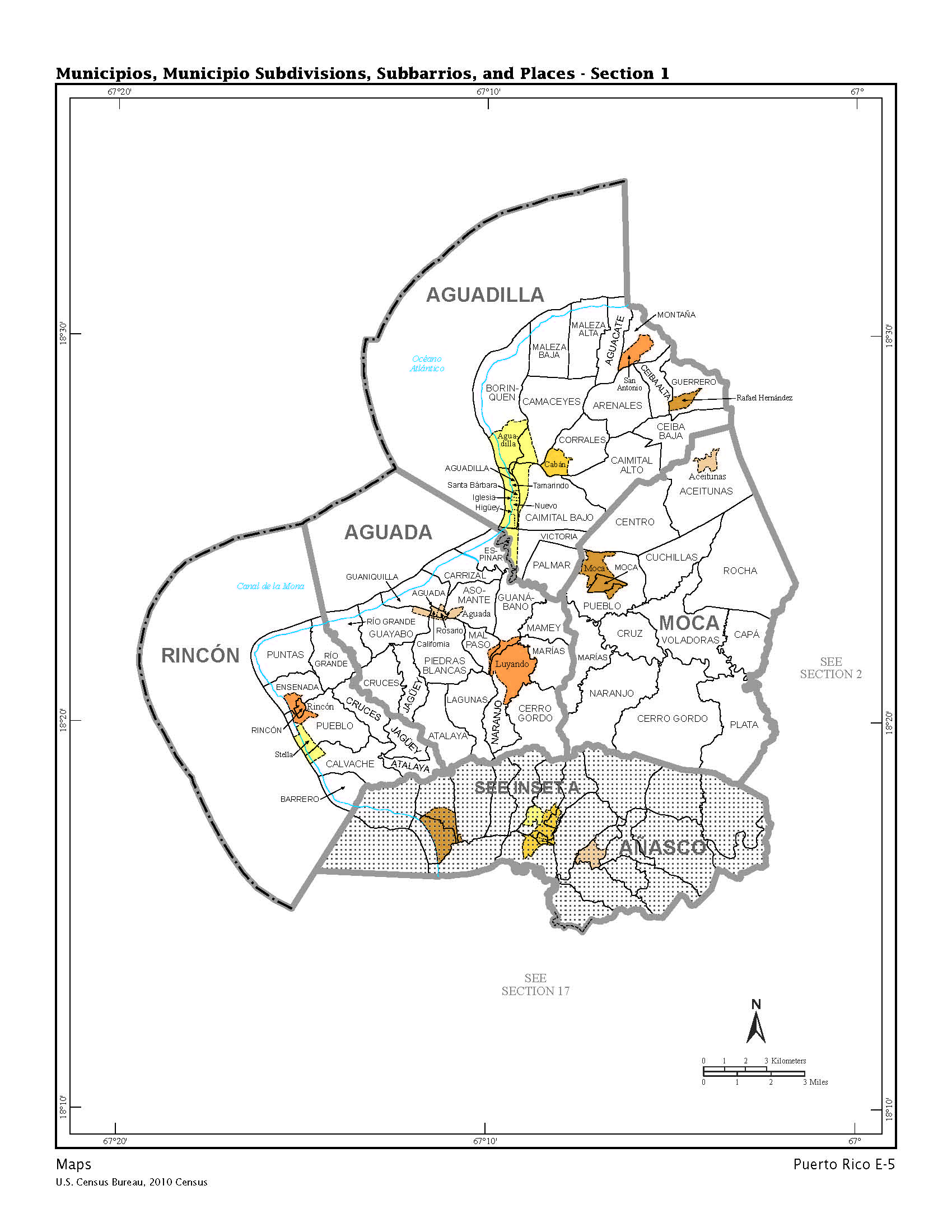
US 2010 census map of Municipios, Municipio Subdivisions, Subbarrios, and Places of Aguadilla, Aguada, Rincón, and Moca in Puerto Rico

- Avenida Los Robles
- Calle Barbosa
- Calle Ceiba
- Calle Duda
- Calle Fuerte
- Calle Reguero
- Calle Stahl
- Callejón del Fuerte
- Cerro Juan Vega
- Condominio Cuesta Vieja
- El Chapey
- El Perú
- Joya Las Marinas
- Residencial Cuesta Vieja
- Residencial Puesta del Sol
- Sector Cerro Los Condenados (Cuesta Vieja)
- Sector Cerro Reguero
- Sector Cuesta Nueva
- Sector Cuesta Vieja
- Sector La Vía (Norte)
- Sector Llanos Jiménez
- Sector Luquillo
- Sector Tamarindo

==== Barrio Pueblo (Sur y Centro) ====
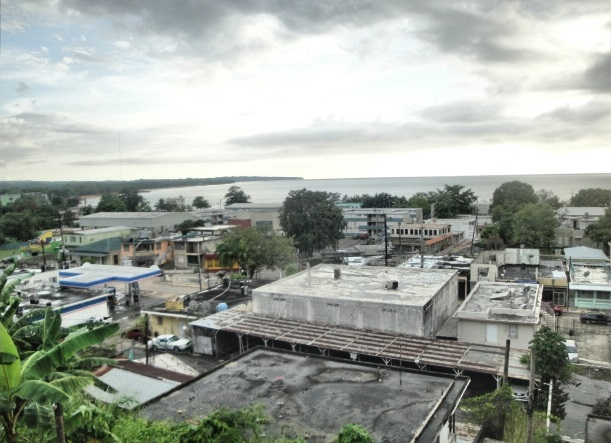
"Barrio" Higuey is a sector of Aguadilla barrio-pueblo

- Avenida San Carlos
- Barriada Visbal
- Barrio Higuey
- Barrio Iglesias
- Calle Mercado
- Calle Mercedes Moreno
- Calle Progreso
- Cerro Cabrera
- Cerro Calero

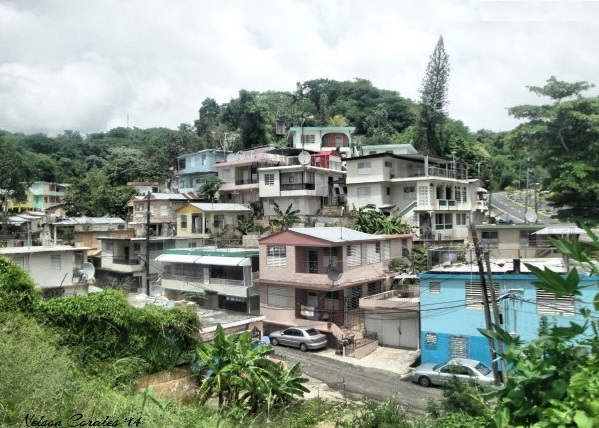
Cerro Echevarría sector in Aguadilla barrio-pueblo

- Cerro Echevarría
- Cerro Gonzalo
- Condominio Torres del Sol
- Condominio Villa Mar
- Residencial Villamar
- Salsipuedes
- Santa Bárbara
- Sector Campo Alegre
- Sector Cerro Las Ánimas
- Sector Gregorio Vélez Vaz
- Sector Joyas San Carlos
- Sector La Vía (Sur)

=== Arenales ===
- Condominio San Carlos
- Sector La Charca
- Urbanización Solares

=== Borinquen ===
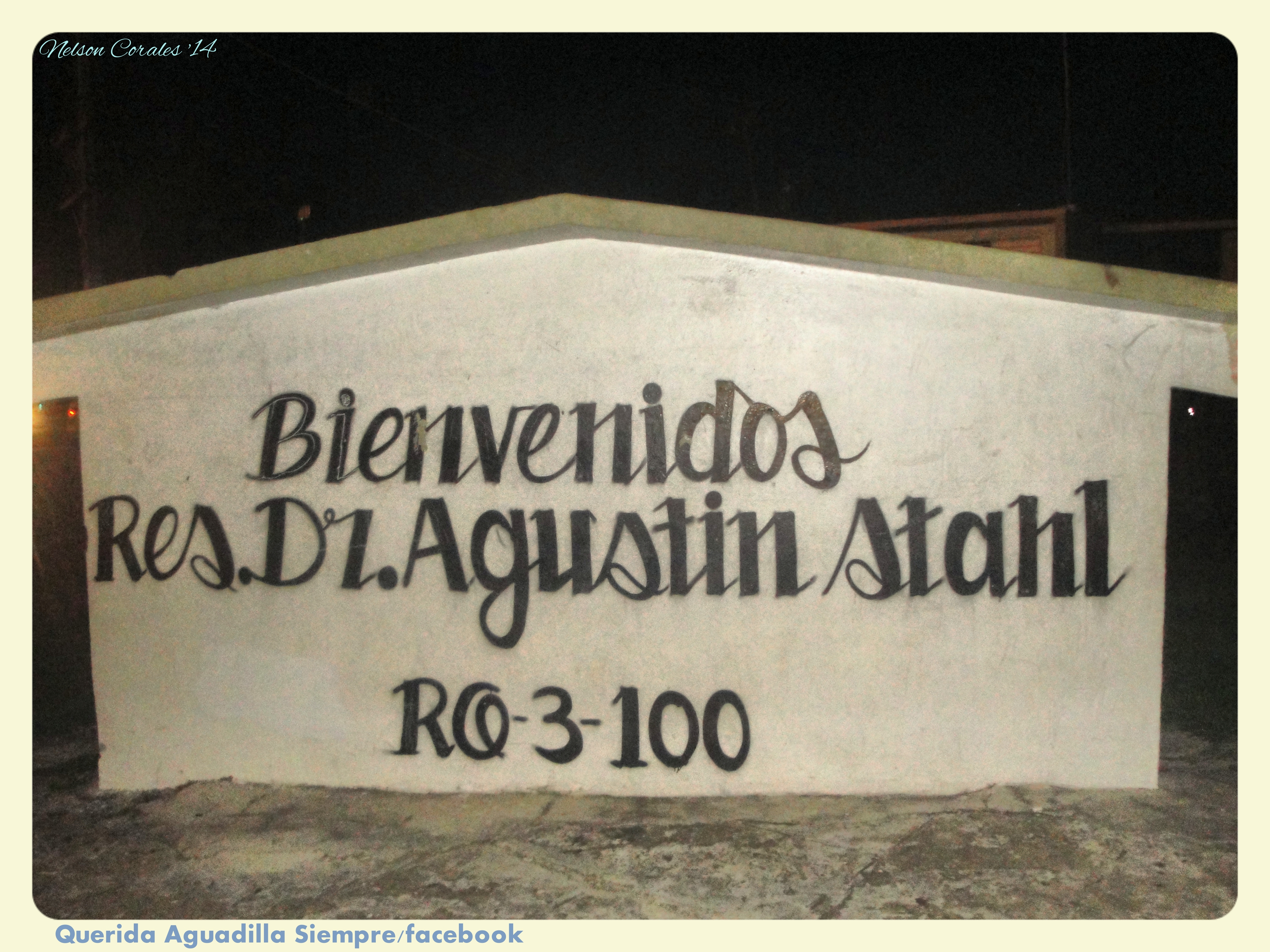
Residencial Público Agustín Stahl in Borinquen

- Apartamentos Sea View
- Avenida Montemar
- Comunidad Borinquen (Parcelas Nuevas)
- Condominio Puerta del Mar
- Extensión Villa Marbella
- Jardines de Borinquen
- Reparto El Faro
- Reparto Ramos
- Reparto Solá
- Reparto Tres Palmas
- Residencial Público Agustín Stahl
- Sandford
- Sector Crash Boat
- Sector El Chapey
- Sector El Cobo
- Sector El Cuco
- Sector El Faro
- Sector El Macetazo
- Sector El Saco
- Sector Jobos
- Sector Las Dos Curvas
- Sector Nino Valentín
- Sector Playa India

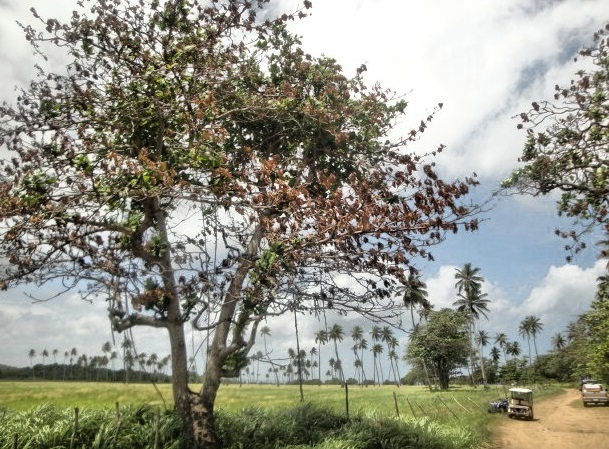
Area de La Poza de Pachy, Sector Playuela in Barrio Borinquen in Aguadilla

- Sector Playuela
- Sector Rovira
- Urbanización Bella Flores
- Urbanización Borinquen
- Urbanización Costa del Mar
- Urbanización Costa del Sol
- Urbanización El Verde
- Urbanización Flamboyán
- Urbanización Laderas del Mar
- Urbanización Las Américas
- Urbanización Las Casitas
- Urbanización Las Mansiones
- Urbanización Marbella
- Urbanización Monte Verde
- Urbanización Parque Los Caobos
- Urbanización Villa Blanca
- Urbanización Villa Haydeé
- Urbanización Villa Krystal
- Urbanización Villa Matías
- Urbanización Villa Ruth
- Villa Águeda
- Villa Betania
- Villa de Palma Real
- Villa Lydia
- Villa Marta
- Vista Alegre

=== Caimital Alto ===
- Apartamentos Los Rosa
- Apartamentos Paseo Miramar
- Carretera los Rosa
- Reparto Caimital
- Reparto Grajales
- Reparto Herreras
- Reparto Natividad Romero
- Reparto Villa Grajales
- Sector Carretera La Palma
- Sector Laureles
- Sector Los López
- Sector Pellot
- Sector Pupo Jiménez
- Sector Reichard
- Sector Sotomayor
- Sector Villa Santana
- Sector Zambrana
- Urbanización La Palma
- Urbanización Mansiones de Versalles
- Urbanización Paseo de Aguadilla
- Urbanización Quintas de Monterey
- Urbanización Villa Avelina
- Urbanización Villa del Carmen
- Urbanización Villas de Monserrate
- Urbanización Villas del Rey

=== Caimital Bajo ===
- Apartamentos Villa Mar
- Avenida Jesús T. Piñero
- Avenida Los Corazones
- Avenida Victoria
- Callejón Los Concepción
- Condominio Manuel A. Colón
- Condominio Muñekís II
- Cuesta Vieja
- Égida Jardín del Atlántico
- Los Robles
- Monte Brujo
- Paseo Las Golondrinas
- Reparto Grajales
- Residencial José A. Aponte
- Residencial José de Diego
- Richard Moufler
- Sector Cambija
- Sector El Jobo
- Sector Gregorio Igartua
- Sector La Pica
- Sector Lloret
- Sector Sanders
- Sector Toño Colón
- Urbanización Aromas de Café
- Urbanización García
- Urbanización Jardines de Maribel
- Urbanización Monte Real
- Urbanización Victoria
- Villa Alegría

=== Camaceyes ===
- Barrio Camaceyes Este
- Barrio Camaceyes Sur
- Calle El Castillo
- Calle González
- Calle Los Morales
- Calle Tony Croato
- Carretera Feliciano
- Condominio Chalet Deville
- Condominio Portales de Camaceyes
- Égida Víctor Hernández
- Extensión El Prado
- Hacienda Andares
- Llanos Verdes
- Los Morales
- Los Vázquez
- Paseo del Parque
- Paseos de Jaicoa
- Paseos Providencia
- Reparto Jiménez
- Reparto Llanos Verdes
- Reparto López
- Reparto San José
- Residencial Montaña
- Residencial Villa Nueva
- Residencial y Urbanización García Ducós
- Sector Barrio Las Palomas
- Sector El Cuco
- Sector Feliciano
- Sector La Alambra
- Sector La Esquina
- Sector Santos Gómez
- Sector Solá del Llano
- Urbanización Alhambra
- Urbanización El Prado
- Urbanización Hacienda Los Andrés
- Urbanización Jardines de Aguadilla
- Urbanización Las Colinas
- Urbanización Maleza Gardens
- Urbanización Montaña
- Urbanización Parque La Arboleda
- Urbanización Paseo Alta Vista
- Urbanización Paseo Lomas Llanas
- Urbanización Paseo Universitario
- Urbanización Portales de Camaceyes
- Urbanización Rubianes
- Urbanización San Carlos
- Urbanización Tony Croatto
- Urbanización Villas de Prado Alto
- Urbanización Villas del Horizonte
- Urbanización Villas Universitarias
- Villa Juanita
- Villa Universidad

=== Ceiba Alta ===
- Calle Kennedy
- Condominio Monte Real
- Hacienda Loma Linda
- Reparto González Ramos
- Reparto Ramos Cerezo
- Reparto Ramos Muñiz
- Sector Venetian
- Urbanización Mansiones Puertas del Cielo
- Urbanización Paseo Los Cerezos
- Urbanización Paseos Reales
- Urbanización Vista al Horizonte
- Villa Cortez

=== Ceiba Baja ===
- Carretera Sanders
- Paseos de Aguadilla
- Reparto Apolo
- Reparto González
- Reparto Riollano
- Reparto Santa María
- Reparto Villa Grajales
- Sector Angelito Cruz
- Sector Herrera
- Sector Los Posada
- Sector Monte Cristo
- Sector Paseo del Paraíso
- Sector Villa Damasco
- Urbanización Atlantic View
- Urbanización Estancias Barreto
- Urbanización Jardines de Versalles
- Urbanización Quintas de Monterey
- Urbanización Villa Esperanza
- Urbanización Villas del Rey

=== Corrales ===
- Apartamentos Galero
- Cabán Viejo
- Calle Alelí
- Calle Húcar
- Calle Yagrumo
- Comunidad Cabán
- Condominio Muñekís I
- Reparto San Francisco
- Reparto Santa Ana
- Residencial Las Muñecas
- Sector Angelito Cruz
- Sector Carretera La Palma
- Sector Villa Cardona
- Sector Villa Estancia
- Urbanización Cristal (Comunidad Corrales)
- Urbanización Estancias del Atlántico
- Urbanización Esteves
- Urbanización Jardines de Versalles
- Urbanización Monte Azul
- Urbanización Monte Rey
- Urbanización Monte Verde
- Urbanización Paseos del Canal
- Urbanización Santa María
- Urbanización Santa Marta
- Urbanización Villa del Rocío
- Urbanización Villa Estela
- Urbanización Villa Linda
- Urbanización Vista Verde (Cabán Nuevo)

=== Guerrero ===
- Comunidad Rafael Hernández
- Reparto La Ceiba
- Sector La Paloma
- Sector Muñiz
- Urbanización Jardines Guerrero
- Urbanización Praderas de la Ceiba

=== Maleza Alta ===
- Urbanización Villa Liza

=== Maleza Baja ===
- Base Ramey
- Sector Las Villas
- Sector Martinica
- Sector Vista Ramey
- Urbanización Base Ramey
- Urbanización Las Villas Light House

=== Montaña ===
- Poblado San Antonio
- Reparto Chepo Fernández
- Reparto Los Pinos
- Reparto Roldán
- Residencial Nuevo San Antonio
- Sector Campo Alegre
- Sector Las Palmas
- Sector Pablo Hernández
- Sector Parcelas Nuevas
- Sector Villa Primavera
- Urbanización Brisas de Campo Alegre
- Urbanización Marín García
- Urbanización Paseo Campo Alegre
- Urbanización Paseo Continental
- Urbanización Villa Sotomayor
- Villa Jardines

=== Palmar ===
- Camino Bosque
- Camino Cordero
- Camino Ismael Torres
- Camino Rivera
- Comunidad Palmar
- Reparto Sara
- Sector Arocho
- Sector Corea
- Sector Fuentes
- Sector Los Torres
- Sector Polo Medina
- Sector Viñet
- Urbanización Cortez

=== Victoria ===
- Condominio Vistamar

== See also ==
- List of communities in Puerto Rico
