= Ceiba Alta, Aguadilla, Puerto Rico =

Barrio of Puerto Rico

Ceiba Alta
- Barrio
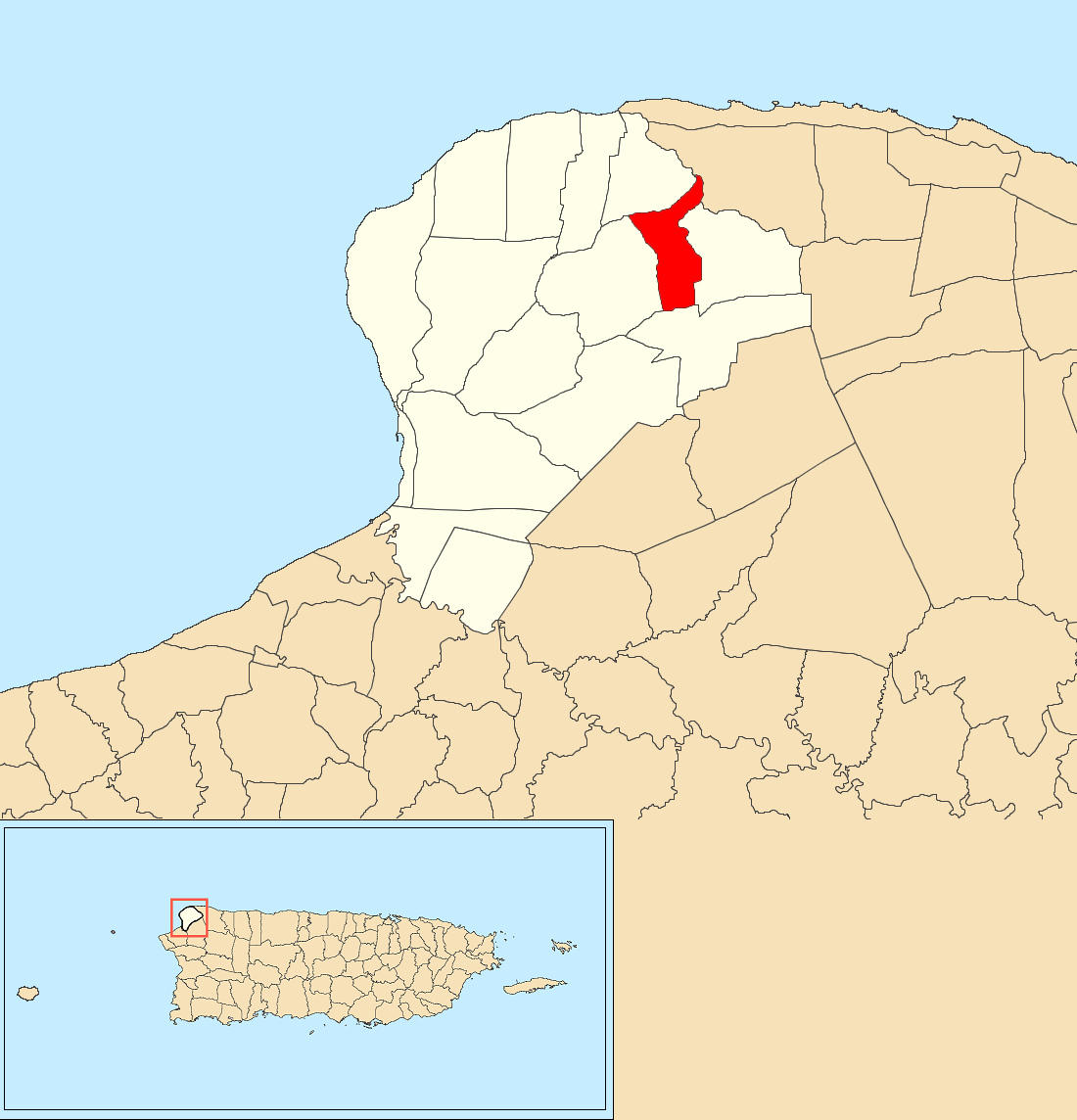

- Location of Puerto Rico
- Coordinates: 18°28′39″N 67°05′16″W
- Commonwealth: Puerto Rico
- Municipality: Aguadilla

Area
  - Total: 1.23 sq mi (3.2 km^{2})
  - Land: 1.23 sq mi (3.2 km^{2})
  - Water: 0.00 sq mi (0 km^{2})
- Elevation: 230 ft (70 m)

Population (2010)
  - Total: 667
  - Density: 542.3/sq mi (209.4/km^{2})
- Source: 2010 Census
- Time zone: UTC−4 (AST)

Ceiba Alta is a rural barrio in the municipality of Aguadilla, Puerto Rico. Its population in 2010 was 667.

== History ==
Ceiba Alta was in Spain's gazetteers until Puerto Rico was ceded by Spain in the aftermath of the Spanish–American War under the terms of the Treaty of Paris of 1898 and became an unincorporated territory of the United States. In 1899, the United States Department of War conducted a census of Puerto Rico finding that the combined population of Ceiba Alta and Ceiba Baja barrios was 1,033.

Historical population
Census	Pop.	Note	%±
1910	380		—
1920	412		8.4%
1930	597		44.9%
1940	549		−8.0%
1950	620		12.9%
1960	399		−35.6%
1970	293		−26.6%
1980	367		25.3%
1990	463		26.2%
2000	566		22.2%
2010	667		17.8%
U.S. Decennial Census; 1900 (N/A) 1910-1930; 1930-1950 1980-2000 2010

== Sectors ==
Barrios (which are, in contemporary times, roughly comparable to minor civil divisions) in turn are further subdivided into smaller local populated place areas/units called sectores (sectors in English). The types of sectores may vary, from normally sector to urbanización to reparto to barriada to residencial, among others.

The following sectors are in Ceiba Alta barrio:

Calle Kennedy, Condominio Monte Real, Hacienda Loma Linda, Reparto González Ramos, Reparto Ramos Cerezo, Reparto Ramos Muñiz, Sector Venetian, Urbanización Mansiones Puertas del Cielo, Urbanización Paseo Los Cerezos, Urbanización Paseos Reales, Urbanización Vista al Horizonte, and Villa Cortez.

== See also ==
- List of communities in Puerto Rico
- List of barrios and sectors of Aguadilla, Puerto Rico
