= A110 =

A110 may refer to:

- A110 road (England), a road in London connecting Woodford and Barnet
- A110 motorway (France), a road connecting Chartres and Sorigny
- A110 road (Malaysia), a road in Perak connecting Gopeng and Kota Baharu Mines
- Alpine A110, a car
- Alpine A110 (2017), a car
- Austin A110, a 1954 British car
- Intel A110, one branding of the ultra low-power mobile Stealey microprocessor by Intel
- One A110, a model of subnotebook bye one.de a.k.a. IL1
- RFA Orangeleaf (A110)
