= Atlantic Gardens Veterans Cemetery =

Cemetery in Montaña, Aguadilla, Puerto Rico

- Interactive map of Atlantic Gardens Veterans Cemetery

Details
- Established: May 2014
- Location: Montaña, Aguadilla, Puerto Rico
- Coordinates: 18°29′59″N 67°06′03″W
- Type: Military
- Size: 17.48 acres (7.07 ha)
- Find a Grave: Atlantic Gardens Veterans Cemetery

Atlantic Gardens Veterans Cemetery is in the United States territory of Puerto Rico. The cemetery was dedicated in May 2014, and designed for approximately 23,000 burials. Located in the Montaña ward of Aguadilla, the cemetery is on the Garden of Eden Boulevard.

The cemetery is owned by the Government of Puerto Rico, grant-funded and operated by the United States Department of Veterans Affairs (VA), which currently manages 155 national cemeteries. In 2016, the VA established the "Pre-Need Determination of Eligibility Program" to assist with advanced planning.

== Notable interments ==
- Rafael Irizarry (1945–2022), Lawyer, Politician elected to the Puerto Rico Senate.

== See also ==
- Morovis National Cemetery
- Puerto Rico National Cemetery
