= B110 =

B110 may refer to:

- B110 (New York City bus), a privately operated bus route in Brooklyn, United States
- Dell Dimension B110, a desktop computer
- B110 series, a Nissan Sunny car series
- Nepean Highway, a road in Victoria, Australia
- Bellarine Highway, a road in Victoria, Australia
- A bus service serving Mid Valley Megamall in Kuala Lumpur, Malaysia
- SMS B110, a German torpedo-boat
