= PA-112 (Pará highway) =

Highway in Pará, Brazil

Location
- Country: Brazil
- State: Pará

Highway system
- Highways in Brazil; Federal

The PA-112 or Rodovia Dom Eliseu Corolli is a state highway located in the Brazilian state of Pará. This road intersects BR-308 at its northern boundary and BR-316 at its southern boundary.

It is located in the northeast region of the state, serving the municipalities of Bragança and Santa Luzia do Pará.
