= Corrales, Aguadilla, Puerto Rico =

Barrio of Puerto Rico

Corrales
- Barrio
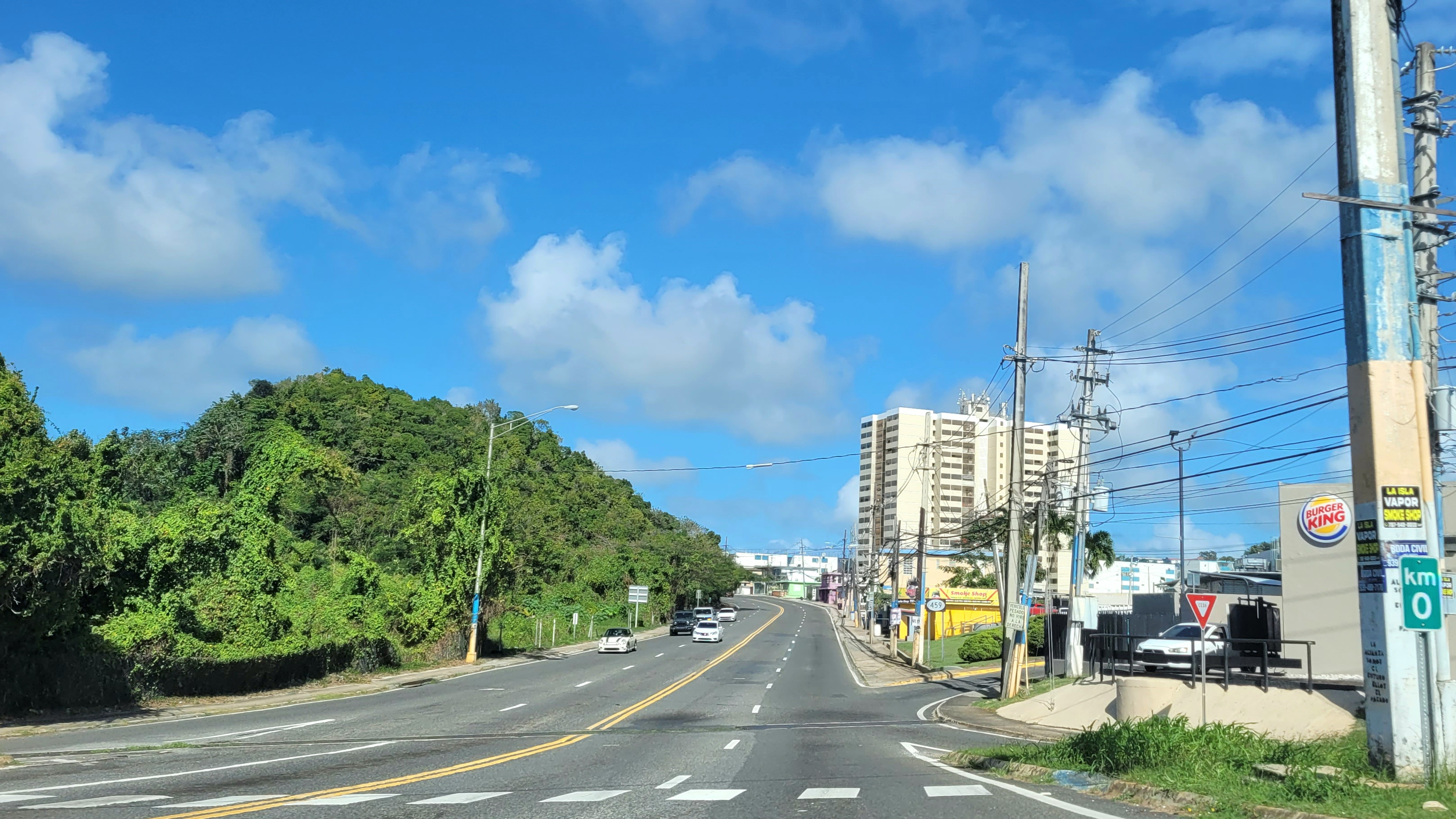
- Puerto Rico Highway 459 between Camaceyes and Corrales

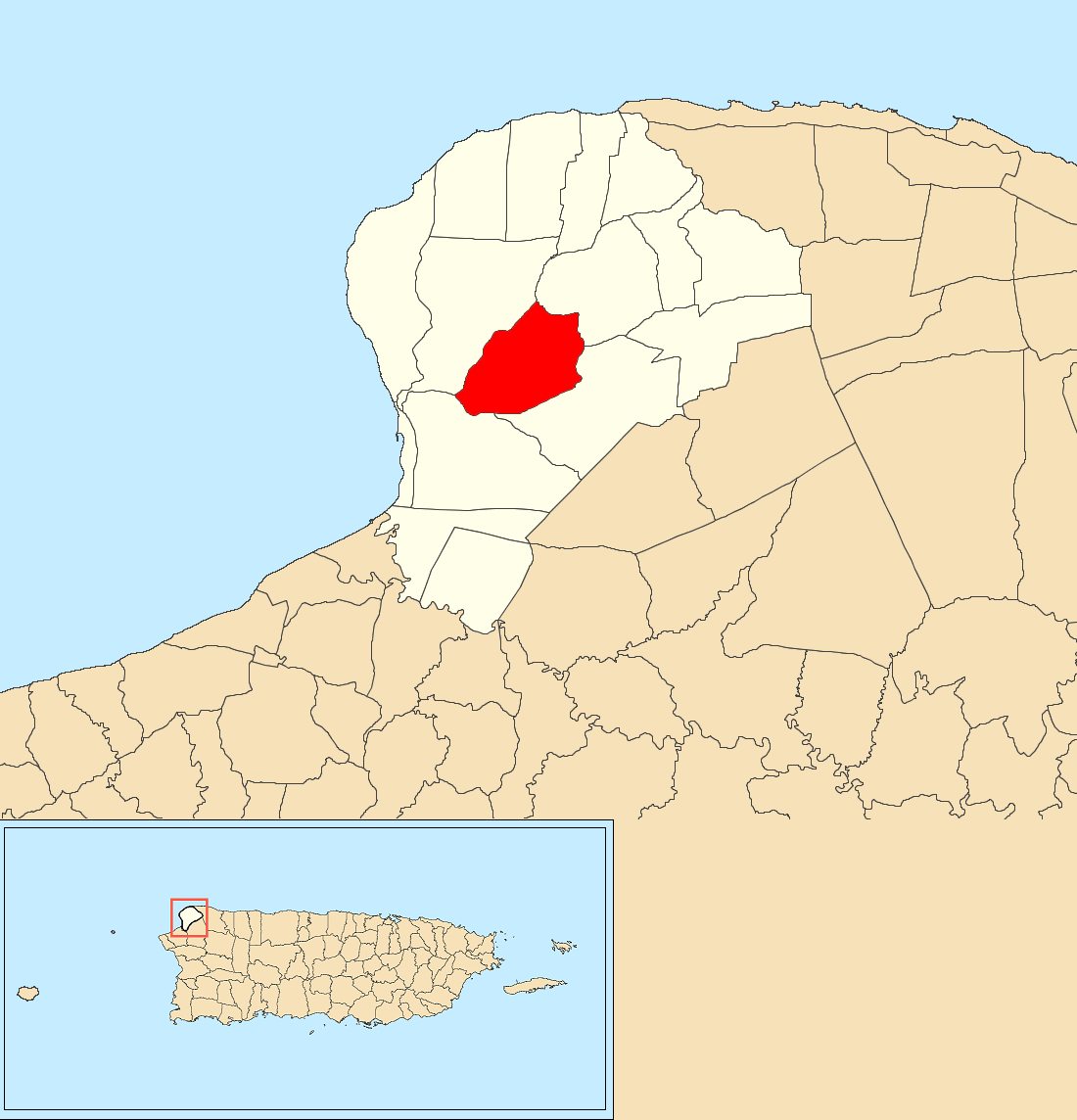

- Location of Puerto Rico
- Coordinates: 18°27′10″N 67°07′51″W
- Commonwealth: Puerto Rico
- Municipality: Aguadilla

Area
  - Total: 2.41 sq mi (6.2 km^{2})
  - Land: 2.41 sq mi (6.2 km^{2})
  - Water: 0.00 sq mi (0 km^{2})
- Elevation: 502 ft (153 m)

Population (2010)
  - Total: 7,659
  - Density: 3,178/sq mi (1,227/km^{2})
- Source: 2010 Census
- Time zone: UTC−4 (AST)

Corrales is a rural barrio in the municipality of Aguadilla, Puerto Rico. Its population in 2010 was 7,659. In Corrales barrio is Cabán, a comunidad.

== History ==
Corrales was in Spain's gazetteers until Puerto Rico was ceded by Spain in the aftermath of the Spanish–American War under the terms of the Treaty of Paris of 1898 and became an unincorporated territory of the United States. In 1899, the United States Department of War conducted a census of Puerto Rico finding that the combined population of Corrales and Caimatal Alto barrios was 1,158.

Historical population
Census	Pop.	Note	%±
1910	625		—
1920	775		24.0%
1930	888		14.6%
1940	1,086		22.3%
1950	2,950		171.6%
1960	3,471		17.7%
1970	3,567		2.8%
1980	6,086		70.6%
1990	7,994		31.4%
2000	8,546		6.9%
2010	7,659		−10.4%
U.S. Decennial Census; 1900 (N/A) 1910-1930; 1930-1950 1980-2000 2010

== Sectors ==
Barrios (which are, in contemporary times, roughly comparable to minor civil divisions) in turn are further subdivided into smaller local populated place areas/units called sectores (sectors in English). The types of sectores may vary, from normally sector to urbanización to reparto to barriada to residencial, among others.

The following sectors are in Corrales barrio:

Apartamentos Galero, Cabán Viejo, Calle Alelí, Calle Húcar, Calle Yagrumo, Comunidad Cabán, Condominio Muñekís I, Reparto San Francisco, Reparto Santa Ana, Residencial Las Muñecas, Sector Angelito Cruz, Sector Carretera La Palma, Sector Villa Cardona, Sector Villa Estancia, Urbanización Cristal (Comunidad Corrales), Urbanización Estancias del Atlántico, Urbanización Esteves, Urbanización Jardines de Versalles, Urbanización Monte Azul, Urbanización Monte Rey, Urbanización Monte Verde, Urbanización Paseos del Canal, Urbanización Santa María, Urbanización Santa Marta, Urbanización Villa del Rocío, Urbanización Villa Estela, Urbanización Villa Linda, and Urbanización Vista Verde (Cabán Nuevo).

== See also ==
- List of communities in Puerto Rico
- List of barrios and sectors of Aguadilla, Puerto Rico
