= Pueblo, Moca, Puerto Rico =

Barrio of Puerto Rico

Pueblo
- Barrio
- Interactive map of Pueblo
- Coordinates: 18°23′36″N 67°06′45″W
- Commonwealth: Puerto Rico
- Municipality: Moca

Area
  - Total: 3.80 sq mi (9.8 km^{2})
  - Land: 3.79 sq mi (9.8 km^{2})
  - Water: 0.01 sq mi (0.026 km^{2})
- Elevation: 118 ft (36 m)

Population (2010)
  - Total: 6,364
  - Density: 1,834/sq mi (708/km^{2})
- Source: 2010 Census
- Time zone: UTC−4 (AST)

Pueblo barrio is a barrio in the municipality of Moca, Puerto Rico. Its population in 2010 was 6,364.

== History ==
Pueblo was in Spain's gazetteers until Puerto Rico was ceded by Spain in the aftermath of the Spanish–American War under the terms of the Treaty of Paris of 1898 and became an unincorporated territory of the United States. In 1899, the United States Department of War conducted a census of Puerto Rico finding that the population of Moca Pueblo barrio was 1,470.

Historical population
Census	Pop.	Note	%±
1900	1,470		—
1950	2,034		—
1960	1,894		−6.9%
1970	0		−100.0%
1980	3,829		—
1990	5,169		35.0%
2000	6,600		27.7%
2010	6,364		−3.6%
U.S. Decennial Census; 1899 (shown as 1900) 1910-1930; 1930-1950 1960 1980-2000 2010

== See also ==
- List of communities in Puerto Rico
