= A111 =

A111 may refer to:

- Autobianchi A111, a car
- RFA Oakleaf (A111), a ship
- A111 road (England), a road in London connecting Palmers Green and Potters Bar
- A 111 motorway (Germany), a road connecting the Berliner Stadtring (A 100) and the Berliner Ring (A 10)
- A111 road (Malaysia), a road in Perak
