= Maleza Alta, Aguadilla, Puerto Rico =

Barrio of Puerto Rico

Maleza Alta
- Barrio
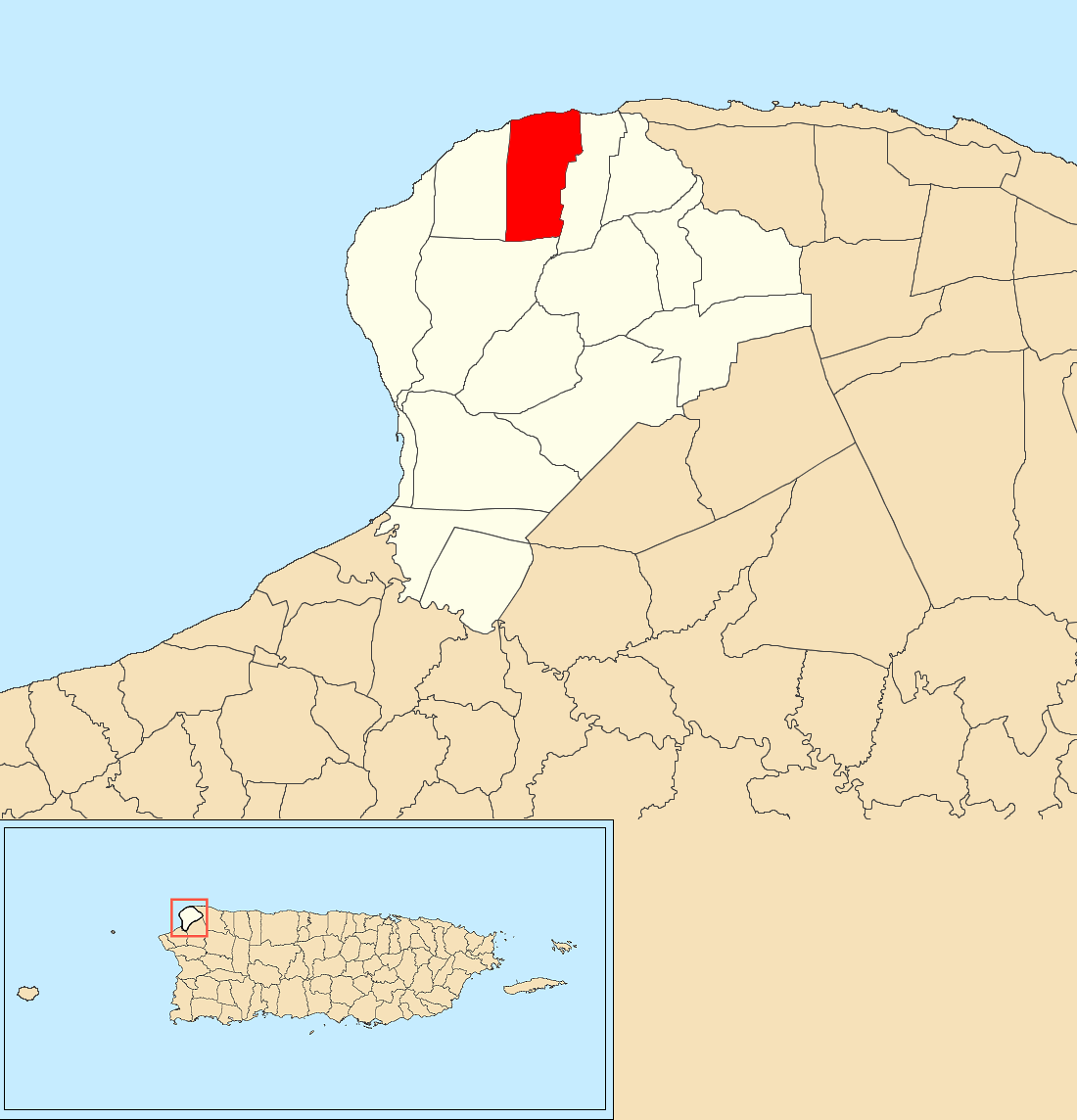

- Location of Puerto Rico
- Coordinates: 18°29′57″N 67°07′24″W
- Commonwealth: Puerto Rico
- Municipality: Aguadilla

Area
  - Total: 2.28 sq mi (5.9 km^{2})
  - Land: 2.02 sq mi (5.2 km^{2})
  - Water: 0.26 sq mi (0.67 km^{2})
- Elevation: 203 ft (62 m)

Population (2010)
  - Total: 1,800
  - Density: 891.1/sq mi (344.1/km^{2})
- Source: 2010 Census
- Time zone: UTC−4 (AST)

Maleza Alta is a rural barrio in the municipality of Aguadilla, Puerto Rico. Its population in 2010 was 1,800.

== History ==
Maleza Alta was in Spain's gazetteers until Puerto Rico was ceded by Spain in the aftermath of the Spanish–American War. Under the terms of the Treaty of Paris of 1898 Puerto Rico became an unincorporated territory of the United States. In 1899, the United States Department of War conducted a census of Puerto Rico finding that the population of Maleza Alta barrio was 784.

The Ramey Air Force Base, a former United States Air Force Base is in Maleza Alta.

Historical population
Census	Pop.	Note	%±
1900	784		—
1910	1,084		38.3%
1920	1,195		10.2%
1930	1,130		−5.4%
1940	1,711		51.4%
1950	553		−67.7%
1960	4,957		796.4%
1970	3,964		−20.0%
1980	2,021		−49.0%
1990	1,443		−28.6%
2000	1,613		11.8%
2010	1,800		11.6%
U.S. Decennial Census; 1899 (shown as 1900) 1910-1930; 1930-1950 1980-2000 2010

== Sectors ==
Barrios (which are, in contemporary times, roughly comparable to minor civil divisions) in turn are further subdivided into smaller local populated place areas/units called sectores (sectors in English). The types of sectores may vary, from normally sector to urbanización to reparto to barriada to residencial, among others.

The following sectors are in Maleza Alta barrio:

Urbanización Villa Liza.

== See also ==
- List of communities in Puerto Rico
- List of barrios and sectors of Aguadilla, Puerto Rico
