= Arenales, Aguadilla, Puerto Rico =

Barrio of Puerto Rico

Arenales
- Barrio
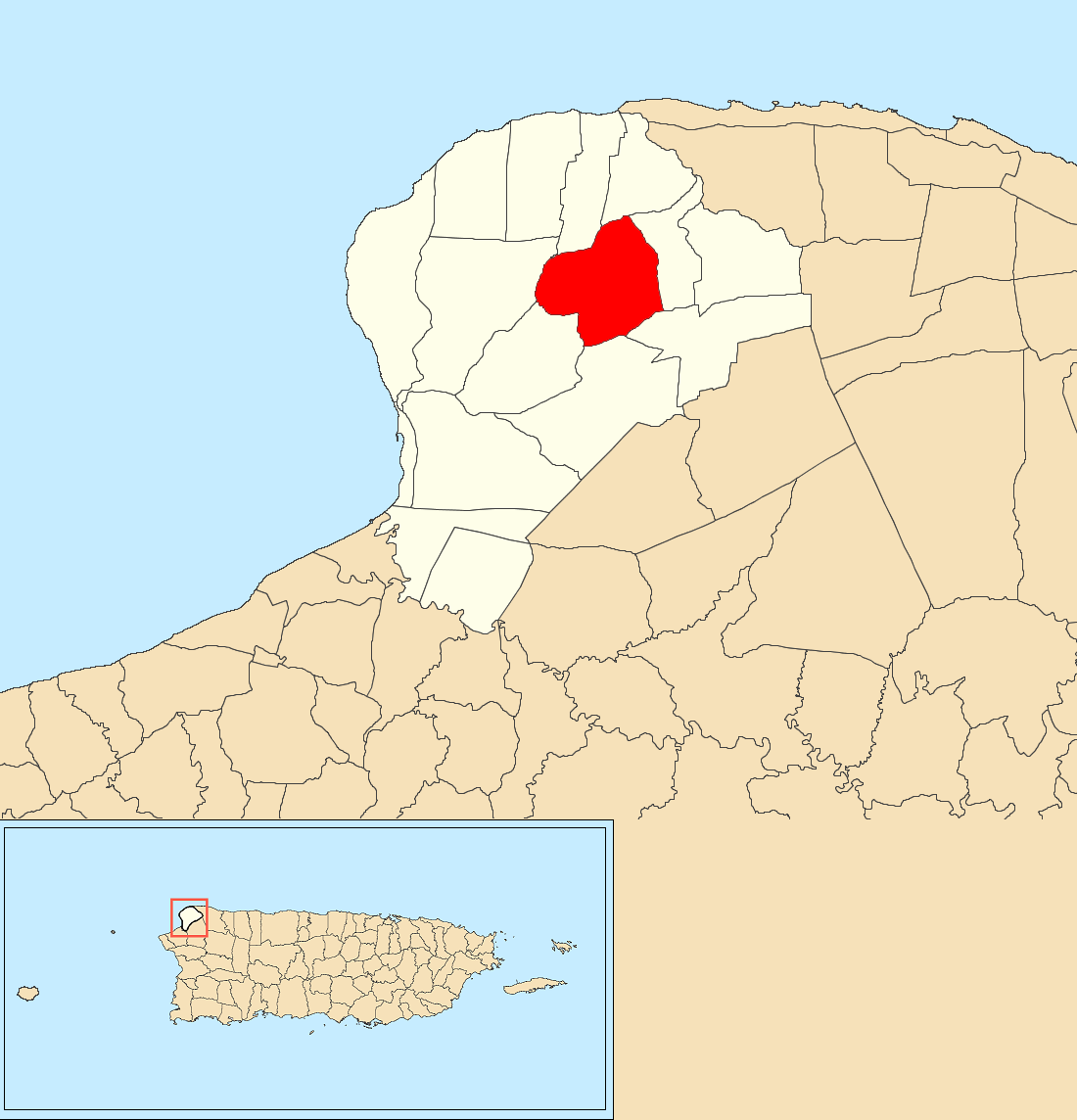

- Location of Puerto Rico in the Caribbean
- Coordinates: 18°28′11″N 67°06′26″W
- Commonwealth: Puerto Rico
- Municipality: Aguadilla

Area
  - Total: 2.75 sq mi (7.1 km^{2})
  - Land: 2.74 sq mi (7.1 km^{2})
  - Water: 0.01 sq mi (0.026 km^{2})
- Elevation: 308 ft (94 m)

Population (2010)
  - Total: 1,983
  - Density: 723.7/sq mi (279.4/km^{2})
- Source: 2010 Census
- Time zone: UTC−4 (AST)

Arenales is a rural barrio in the municipality of Aguadilla, Puerto Rico. Its population in 2010 was 1,983.

== History ==
Arenales was in Spain's gazetteers until Puerto Rico was ceded by Spain in the aftermath of the Spanish–American War under the terms of the Treaty of Paris of 1898 and became an unincorporated territory of the United States. In 1899, the United States Department of War conducted a census of Puerto Rico finding that the combined population of Aguacate barrio and Arenales barrio was 991.

Historical population
Census	Pop.	Note	%±
1910	816		—
1920	903		10.7%
1930	880		−2.5%
1940	1,134		28.9%
1950	816		−28.0%
1960	564		−30.9%
1970	425		−24.6%
1980	658		54.8%
1990	770		17.0%
2000	1,038		34.8%
2010	1,983		91.0%
U.S. Decennial Census; 1900 (N/A) 1910-1930; 1930-1950 1980-2000 2010

== Sectors ==
Barrios (which are, in contemporary times, roughly comparable to minor civil divisions) in turn are further subdivided into smaller local populated place areas/units called sectores (sectors in English). The types of sectores may vary, from normally sector to urbanización to reparto to barriada to residencial, among others.

The following sectors are in Arenales barrio:

Condominio San Carlos, Sector La Charca, and Urbanización Solares.

== See also ==
- List of communities in Puerto Rico
- List of barrios and sectors of Aguadilla, Puerto Rico
