= List of highways numbered 112S =

Route 112S or Highway 112S can refer to multiple roads:

== United States ==
- U.S. Route 112S (former)
- Arkansas Highway 112 Spur (a.k.a. Arkansas Highway 112S)
