= Caimital Bajo, Aguadilla, Puerto Rico =

Barrio of Puerto Rico

Caimital Bajo
- Barrio
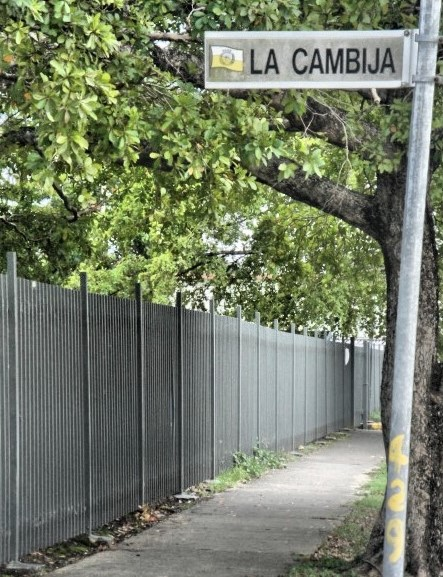
- Walkway in Sector Cambija in Caimital Bajo

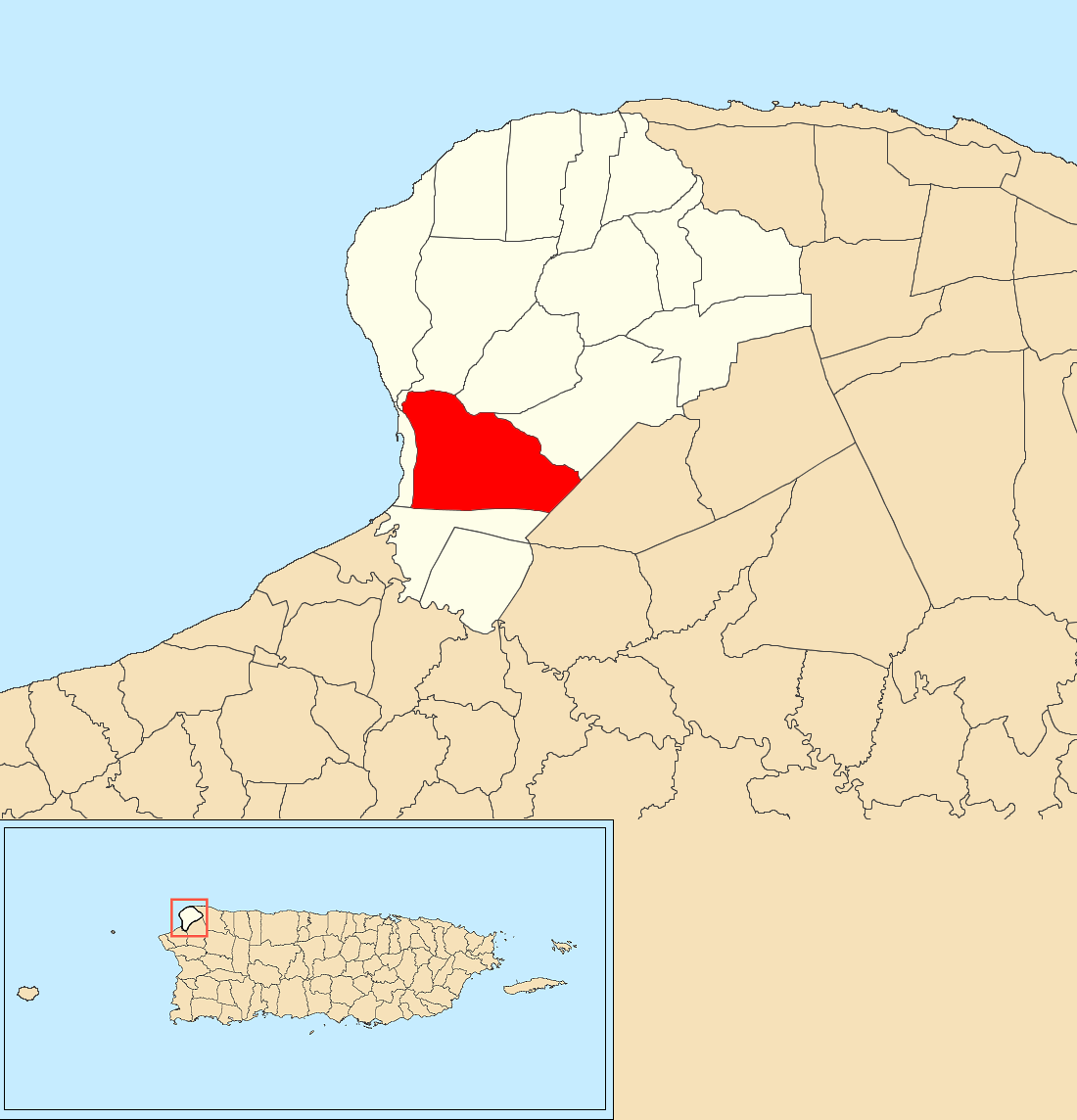

- Location of Puerto Rico
- Coordinates: 18°25′41″N 67°08′13″W
- Commonwealth: Puerto Rico
- Municipality: Aguadilla

Area
  - Total: 3.76 sq mi (9.7 km^{2})
  - Land: 3.76 sq mi (9.7 km^{2})
  - Water: 0.00 sq mi (0 km^{2})
- Elevation: 499 ft (152 m)

Population (2010)
  - Total: 4,487
  - Density: 1,193.4/sq mi (460.8/km^{2})
- Source: 2010 Census
- Time zone: UTC−4 (AST)

Caimital Bajo is a barrio in the municipality of Aguadilla, Puerto Rico. Its population in 2010 was 4,487. In Caimatal Bajo barrio is part of the Aguadilla urban zone.

== History ==
Caimital Bajo was in Spain's gazetteers until Puerto Rico was ceded by Spain in the aftermath of the Spanish–American War under the terms of the Treaty of Paris of 1898 and became an unincorporated territory of the United States. In 1899, the United States Department of War conducted a census of Puerto Rico finding that the population of Caimital Bajo barrio was 943.

Historical population
Census	Pop.	Note	%±
1900	943		—
1910	2,341		148.3%
1920	1,993		−14.9%
1930	1,701		−14.7%
1940	2,289		34.6%
1950	2,351		2.7%
1960	3,373		43.5%
1970	0		−100.0%
1980	4,261		—
1990	5,017		17.7%
2000	5,277		5.2%
2010	4,487		−15.0%
U.S. Decennial Census; 1899 (shown as 1900) 1910-1930; 1930-1950 1980-2000 2010

== Sectors ==
Barrios (which are, in contemporary times, roughly comparable to minor civil divisions) in turn are further subdivided into smaller local populated place areas/units called sectores (sectors in English). The types of sectores may vary, from normally sector to urbanización to reparto to barriada to residencial, among others.

The following sectors are in Caimital Bajo barrio:

Apartamentos Villa Mar, Avenida Jesús T. Piñero, Avenida Los Corazones, Avenida Victoria, Callejón Los Concepción, Condominio Manuel A. Colón, Condominio Muñekís II, Cuesta Vieja, Égida Jardín del Atlántico, Los Robles, Monte Brujo, Paseo Las Golondrinas, Reparto Grajales, Residencial José A. Aponte, Residencial José de Diego, Richard Moufler, Sector Cambija, Sector El Jobo, Sector Gregorio Igartua, Sector La Pica, Sector Lloret, Sector Sanders, Sector Toño Colón, Urbanización Aromas de Café, Urbanización García, Urbanización Jardines de Maribel, Urbanización Monte Real, Urbanización Victoria, and Villa Alegría.

== Gallery ==
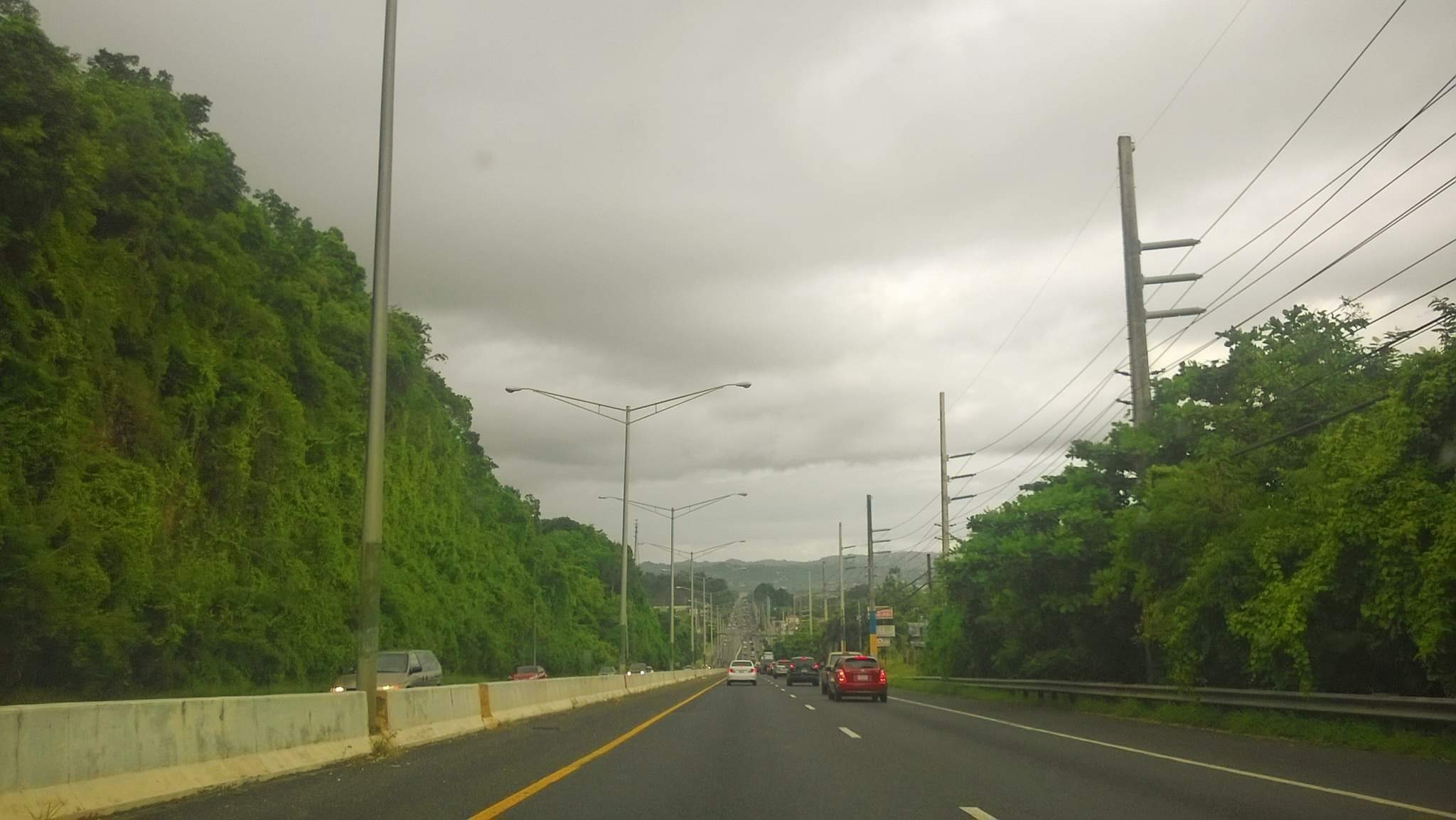
Puerto Rico Highway 2 in Caimital Bajo

== See also ==
- List of communities in Puerto Rico
- List of barrios and sectors of Aguadilla, Puerto Rico
