= Montaña, Aguadilla, Puerto Rico =

Barrio of Puerto Rico

Montaña
- Barrio
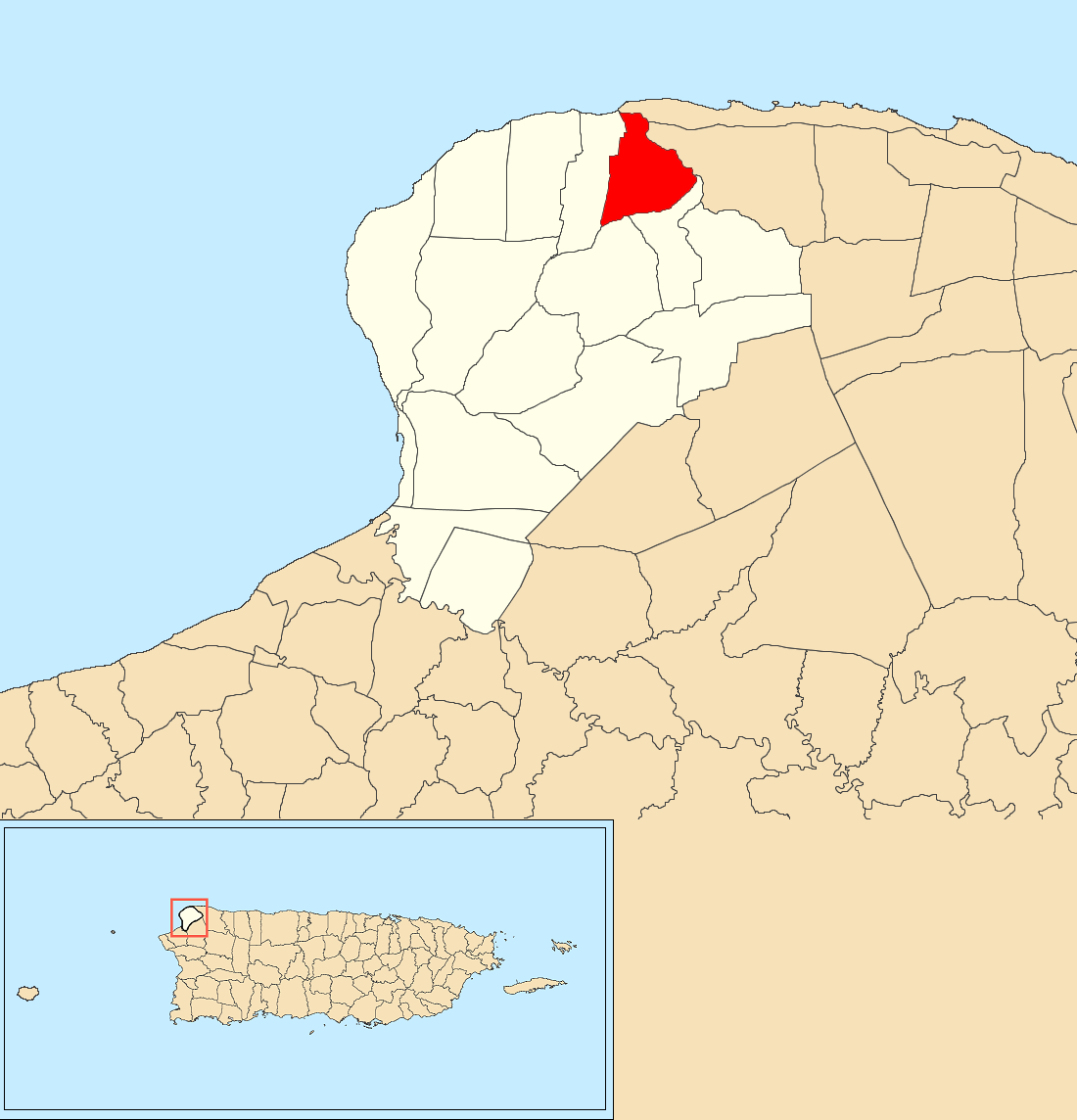

- Location of Puerto Rico
- Coordinates: 18°29′51″N 67°05′49″W
- Commonwealth: Puerto Rico
- Municipality: Aguadilla

Area
  - Total: 1.55 sq mi (4.0 km^{2})
  - Land: 1.55 sq mi (4.0 km^{2})
  - Water: 0.00 sq mi (0 km^{2})
- Elevation: 226 ft (69 m)

Population (2010)
  - Total: 4,068
  - Density: 2,624.5/sq mi (1,013.3/km^{2})
- Source: 2010 Census
- Time zone: UTC−4 (AST)

Montaña is a rural barrio in the municipality of Aguadilla, Puerto Rico. Its population in 2010 was 4,068. In Montaña barrio is the San Antonio community.

== History ==
Montaña was in Spain's gazetteers until Puerto Rico was ceded by Spain in the aftermath of the Spanish–American War under the terms of the Treaty of Paris of 1898 and became an unincorporated territory of the United States. In 1899, the United States Department of War conducted a census of Puerto Rico finding that the population of Montaña barrio was 633.

Historical population
Census	Pop.	Note	%±
1900	633		—
1910	754		19.1%
1920	667		−11.5%
1930	813		21.9%
1940	942		15.9%
1950	875		−7.1%
1960	2,198		151.2%
1970	2,976		35.4%
1980	3,242		8.9%
1990	3,804		17.3%
2000	4,027		5.9%
2010	4,068		1.0%
U.S. Decennial Census; 1899 (shown as 1900) 1910-1930; 1930-1950 1980-2000 2010

== Sectors ==
Barrios (which are, in contemporary times, roughly comparable to minor civil divisions) in turn are further subdivided into smaller local populated place areas/units called sectores (sectors in English). The types of sectores may vary, from normally sector to urbanización to reparto to barriada to residencial, among others.

The following sectors are in Montaña barrio:

Poblado San Antonio, Reparto Chepo Fernández, Reparto Los Pinos, Reparto Roldán, Residencial Nuevo San Antonio, Sector Campo Alegre, Sector Las Palmas, Sector Pablo Hernández, Sector Parcelas Nuevas, Sector Villa Primavera, Urbanización Brisas de Campo Alegre, Urbanización Marín García, Urbanización Paseo Campo Alegre, Urbanización Paseo Continental, Urbanización Villa Sotomayor, and Villa Jardines.

== See also ==
- List of communities in Puerto Rico
- List of barrios and sectors of Aguadilla, Puerto Rico
- Atlantic Gardens Veterans Cemetery
