= Aguacate, Aguadilla, Puerto Rico =

Barrio of Puerto Rico

Aguacate
- Barrio
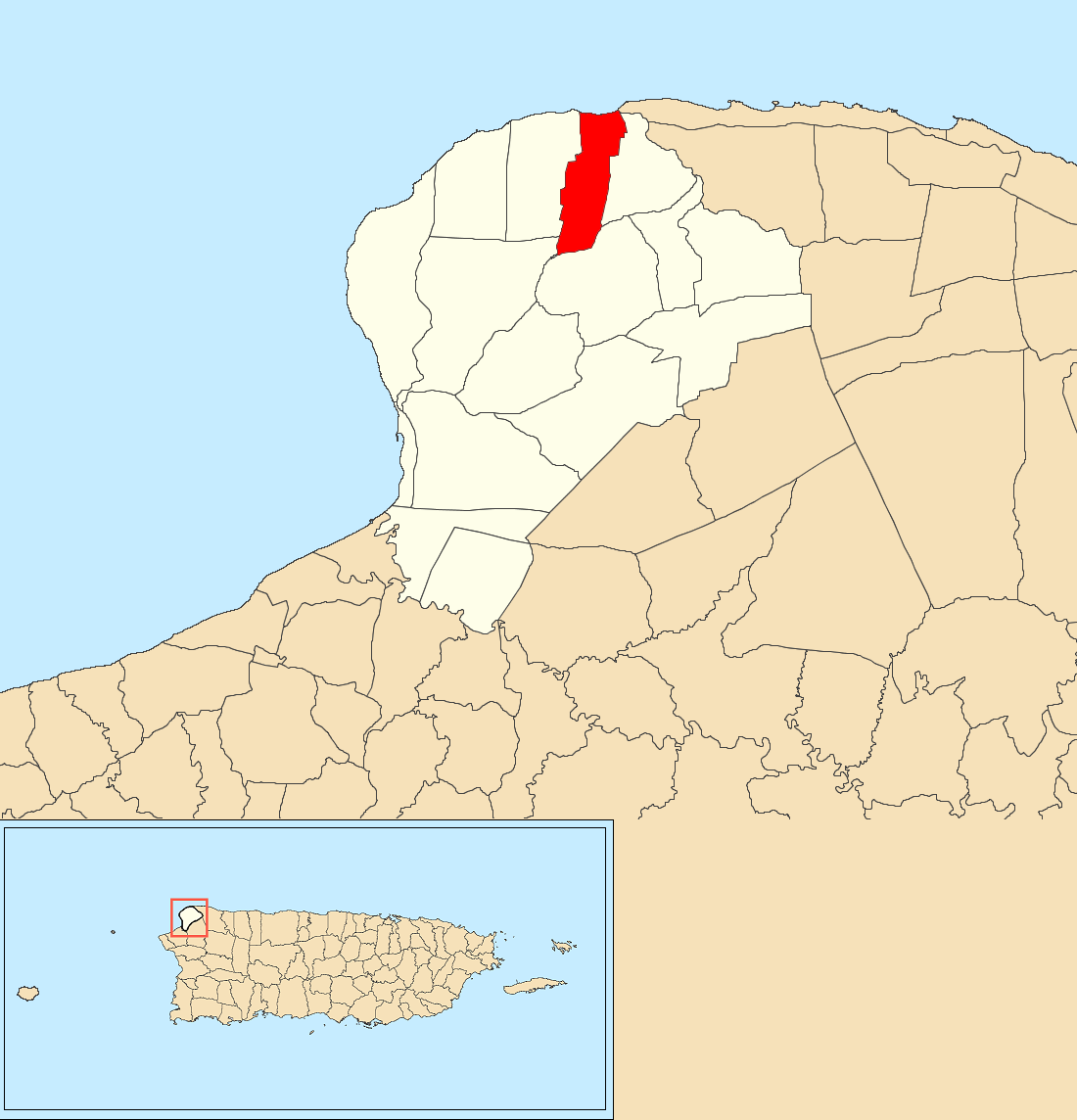

- Location of Puerto Rico
- Coordinates: 18°29′59″N 67°06′41″W
- Commonwealth: Puerto Rico
- Municipality: Aguadilla

Area
  - Total: 1.65 sq mi (4.3 km^{2})
  - Land: 1.48 sq mi (3.8 km^{2})
  - Water: 0.17 sq mi (0.44 km^{2})
- Elevation: 203 ft (62 m)

Population (2010)
  - Total: 1,525
  - Density: 1,030.4/sq mi (397.8/km^{2})
- Source: 2010 Census
- Time zone: UTC−4 (AST)
- ZIP Code: 00603

Aguacate is a barrio in the municipality of Aguadilla, Puerto Rico. Its population in 2010 was 1,525.

== History ==
Aguacate was in Spain's gazetteers until Puerto Rico was ceded by Spain in the aftermath of the Spanish–American War under the terms of the Treaty of Paris of 1898 and became an unincorporated territory of the United States. In 1899, the United States Department of War conducted a census of Puerto Rico finding that the combined population of Aguacate barrio and Arenales was 991.

Historical population
Census	Pop.	Note	%±
1910	440		—
1920	466		5.9%
1930	624		33.9%
1940	976		56.4%
1950	1,278		30.9%
1960	696		−45.5%
1970	727		4.5%
1980	731		0.6%
1990	1,149		57.2%
2000	1,531		33.2%
2010	1,525		−0.4%
U.S. Decennial Census; 1900 (N/A) 1910-1930; 1930-1950 1980-2000 2010

== Features ==
Aguacate has an elevation of 203 feet.

== Sectors ==
Barrios (which are, in contemporary times, roughly comparable to minor civil divisions) in turn are further subdivided into smaller local populated place areas/units called sectores (sectors in English). The types of sectores may vary, from normally sector to urbanización to reparto to barriada to residencial, among others.

The following sectors are in Aguacate barrio:

Reparto Los Robles, Reparto Roldán, Sector Calero, Sector Villa Min, Urbanización Nuevo San Antonio, Urbanización Quintas de San José, Urbanización Ramón Marín, Urbanización Villa Aurelia, Urbanización Villa del Paraíso, Urbanización Villa Jiménez, Urbanización Villa Montaña, Urbanización Villa Sotomayor, Urbanización Villas del Mar, and Villa Olga.

== See also ==
- List of communities in Puerto Rico
- List of barrios and sectors of Aguadilla, Puerto Rico
