= A110 autoroute =

Proposed motorway in France

The A110 autoroute is a proposed motorway in central France. It will connect Ablis or Chartres and Sorigny south of Tours.
