= Centro, Moca, Puerto Rico =

Barrio of Puerto Rico

Centro
- Barrio
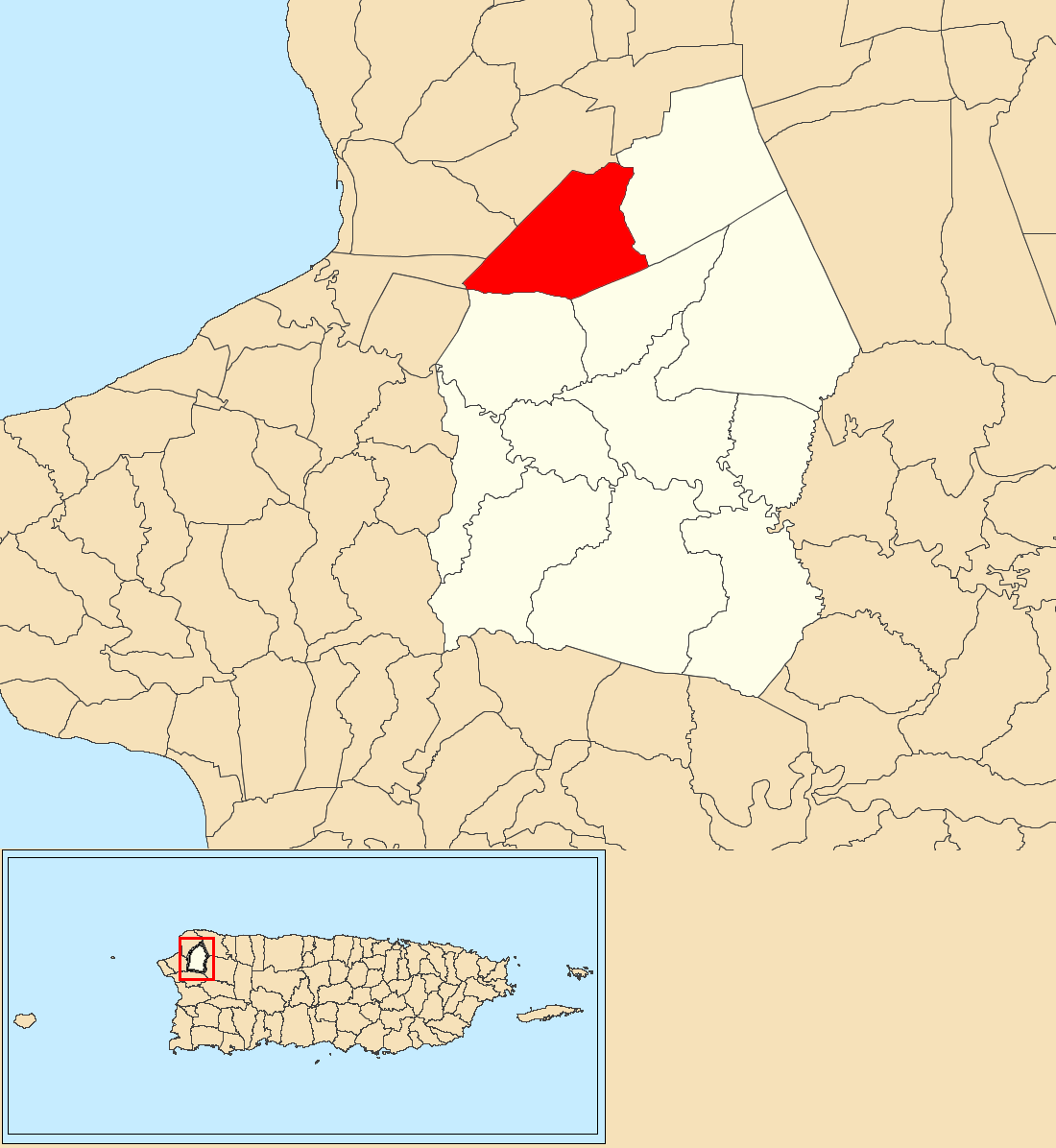
- Location of Centro within the municipality of Moca shown in red

- Location of Puerto Rico
- Coordinates: 18°25′11″N 67°05′59″W
- Commonwealth: Puerto Rico
- Municipality: Moca

Area
  - Total: 3.96 sq mi (10.3 km^{2})
  - Land: 3.96 sq mi (10.3 km^{2})
  - Water: 0 sq mi (0 km^{2})
- Elevation: 745 ft (227 m)

Population (2010)
  - Total: 1,056
  - Density: 745/sq mi (288/km^{2})
- Source: 2010 Census
- Time zone: UTC−4 (AST)

Centro barrio is a barrio in the municipality of Moca, Puerto Rico with a population of 1,056 in 2010.

== History ==
Centro was in Spain's gazetteers until Puerto Rico was ceded by Spain in the aftermath of the Spanish–American War under the terms of the Treaty of Paris of 1898 and became an unincorporated territory of the United States. In 1899, the United States Department of War conducted a census of Puerto Rico finding that the population of Centro barrio was 601.

Historical population
Census	Pop.	Note	%±
1900	601		—
1910	695		15.6%
1920	903		29.9%
1930	884		−2.1%
1940	740		−16.3%
1950	715		−3.4%
1960	731		2.2%
1970	703		−3.8%
1980	785		11.7%
1990	999		27.3%
2000	1,139		14.0%
2010	1,056		−7.3%
U.S. Decennial Census; 1899 (shown as 1900) 1910-1930; 1930-1950 1960 1980-2000 2010

== See also ==
- List of communities in Puerto Rico
