= Caimital Alto, Aguadilla, Puerto Rico =

Barrio of Puerto Rico

Caimital Alto
- Barrio
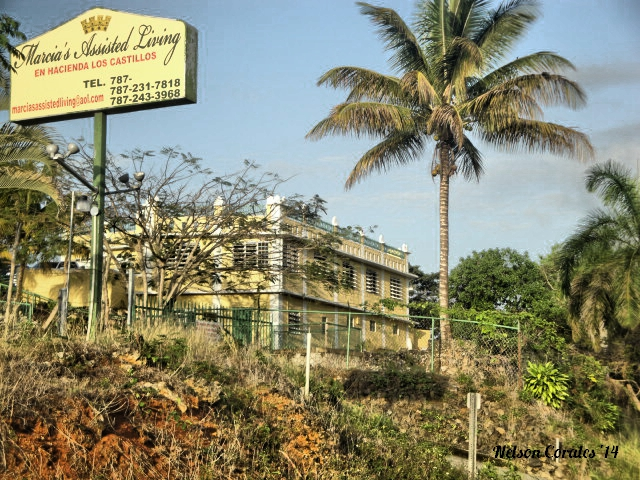
- Building in Caimital Alto

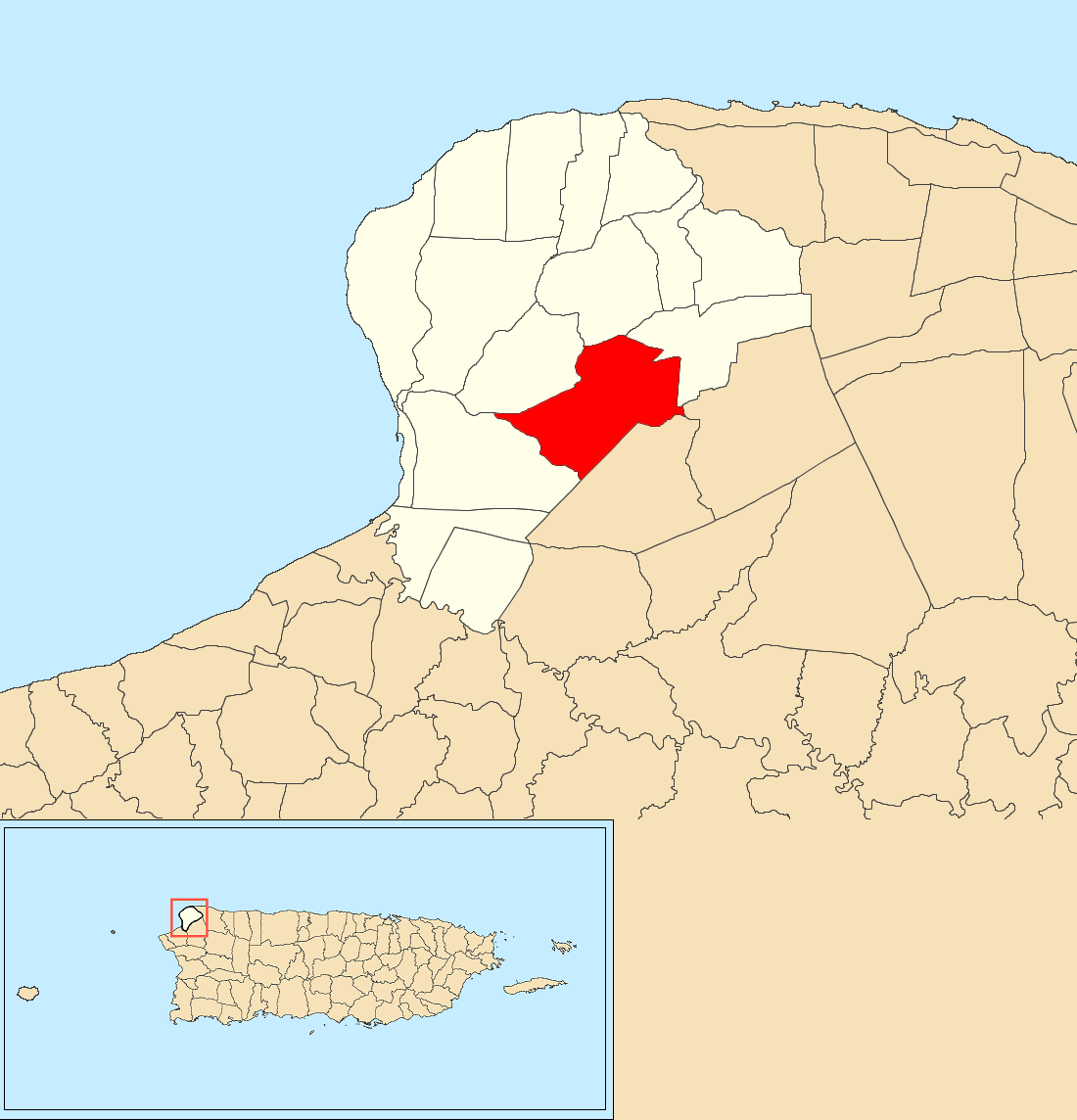

- Location of Puerto Rico
- Coordinates: 18°26′30″N 67°05′46″W
- Commonwealth: Puerto Rico
- Municipality: Aguadilla

Area
  - Total: 3.47 sq mi (9.0 km^{2})
  - Land: 3.47 sq mi (9.0 km^{2})
  - Water: 0 sq mi (0 km^{2})
- Elevation: 522 ft (159 m)

Population (2010)
  - Total: 3,989
  - Density: 1,149.6/sq mi (443.9/km^{2})
- Source: 2010 Census
- Time zone: UTC−4 (AST)

Caimital Alto is a barrio in the municipality of Aguadilla, Puerto Rico. Its population in 2010 was 3,989.

== History ==
Caimital Alto was in Spain's gazetteers until Puerto Rico was ceded by Spain in the aftermath of the Spanish–American War under the terms of the Treaty of Paris of 1898 and became an unincorporated territory of the United States. In 1899, the United States Department of War conducted a census of Puerto Rico finding that the combined population of Caimital Alto barrio and Corrales barrio was 1,158.

Historical population
Census	Pop.	Note	%±
1910	1,012		—
1920	1,260		24.5%
1930	1,202		−4.6%
1940	1,377		14.6%
1950	1,714		24.5%
1960	1,667		−2.7%
1970	1,962		17.7%
1980	2,532		29.1%
1990	2,953		16.6%
2000	3,656		23.8%
2010	3,989		9.1%
U.S. Decennial Census; 1900 (N/A) 1910-1930; 1930-1950 1980-2000 2010

== Sectors ==
Barrios (which are, in contemporary times, roughly comparable to minor civil divisions) in turn are further subdivided into smaller local populated place areas/units called sectores (sectors in English). The types of sectores may vary, from normally sector to urbanización to reparto to barriada to residencial, among others.

The following sectors are in Caimital Alto barrio:

Apartamentos Los Rosa, Apartamentos Paseo Miramar, Carretera los Rosa, Reparto Caimital, Reparto Grajales, Reparto Herreras, Reparto Natividad Romero, Reparto Villa Grajales, Sector Carretera La Palma, Sector Laureles, Sector Los López, Sector Pellot, Sector Pupo Jiménez, Sector Reichard, Sector Sotomayor, Sector Villa Santana, Sector Zambrana, Urbanización La Palma, Urbanización Mansiones de Versalles, Urbanización Paseo de Aguadilla, Urbanización Quintas de Monterey, Urbanización Villa Avelina, Urbanización Villa del Carmen, Urbanización Villas de Monserrate, and Urbanización Villas del Rey.

== See also ==
- List of communities in Puerto Rico
- List of barrios and sectors of Aguadilla, Puerto Rico
