= National Register of Historic Places listings in western Puerto Rico =

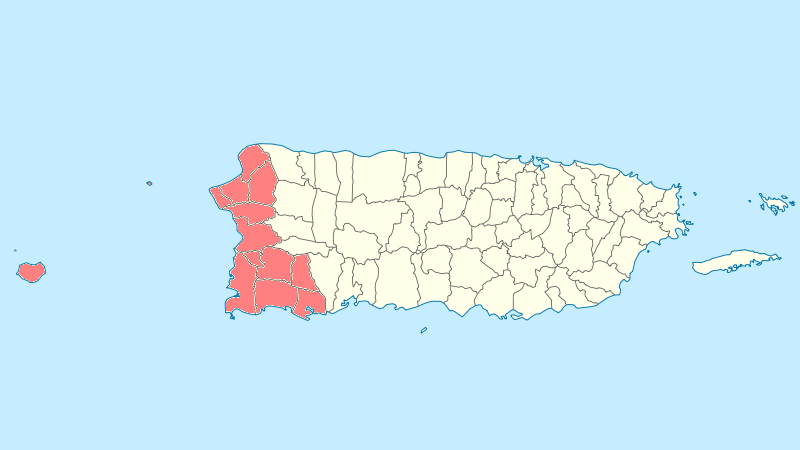
National Register entries listed below are found in the highlighted 12 municipalities of Puerto Rico.

This is a list of properties and districts in the western municipalities of Puerto Rico that are listed on the National Register of Historic Places (Spanish: Registro Nacional de Lugares Históricos). It includes places along the western coast, and on islands, and on the western slope of Puerto Rico's Cordillera Central.

The area covered spans 12 municipalities: Moca, Aguadilla, Aguada, Rincón, Añasco, Mayagüez, Hormigueros, San Germán, Sábana Grande, Guánica, Lajas and Cabo Rojo.

Names of places given are as they appear in the National Register, reflecting name as given in NRHP application at the date of listing. Note, the National Register name system does not accommodate Spanish á, ñ and other letters.

This National Park Service list is complete through NPS recent listings posted May 29, 2026.

== Aguada ==
	Name on the Register	Image	Date listed	Location	Barrio	Description
1	Puente de Coloso	Puente de Coloso	December 29, 2010 (#10001102)	Highway 418, km 0.5; 18°23′57″N 67°09′22″W	Guanábano and Espinar	Truss bridge from 1928 located in Central Coloso formerly used for the transportation of sugarcane across the Culebrinas River. Part of the Historic Bridges of Puerto Rico MPS.

== Aguadilla ==
	Name on the Register	Image	Date listed	Location	Barrio	Description
1	Cardona Residence	Cardona Residence	January 2, 1985 (#85000040)	55 Ramón E. Betances Street; 18°25′45″N 67°09′17″W	Aguadilla Pueblo	Historic house from 1913 designed by architect Manuel Gómez Tejera. One of the few surviving historic residences from before the 1918 earthquake.
2	Casa de Piedra	Casa de Piedra	April 3, 1986 (#86000704)	14 Progreso Street; 18°25′18″N 67°09′16″W	Aguadilla Pueblo	A Spanish colonial house, also known as Amparo Roldán House. Built in 1875 it is the only surviving house in Aguadilla from its era.
3	Church San Carlos Borromeo of Aguadilla	Church San Carlos Borromeo of Aguadilla	September 18, 1984 (#84003124)	José de Diego Street, Town Plaza; 18°25′47″N 67°09′13″W	Aguadilla Pueblo	Historic church from 1783, with its current façade dating to 1887 and designed by architect Pedro Cobreros. Reportedly the only church in Puerto Rico with an apse covered by a groin vault rather than a dome or a barrel vault.
4	District Courthouse	District Courthouse	January 2, 1985 (#85000041)	Progreso Street; 18°25′32″N 67°09′16″W	Aguadilla Pueblo	Former district courthouse designed by famed Puerto Rican architect Rafael Carmoega.
5	Faro de Punta Borinquen	Faro de Punta Borinquen	October 22, 1981 (#81000559)	Off Highway 107; 18°29′50″N 67°08′55″W	Borinquen	Ruins of an important Spanish-built lighthouse from 1889, destroyed by the 1918 earthquake, at one point becoming an important navigational landmark on the route between Europe and the Panama Canal.
6	Fuerte de la Concepción (Note: Sources authoritative with regard to National Register listing parameters give different forms of the fort's name, including Fuerte de la Concepción from the fort's nomination form, Fuerte de la Concepcion from the official weekly announcement of National Register actions, and Fuerte de la Conception from the comprehensive National Register database. This article adopts the first of these, Fuerte de la Concepción, because it offers the most proper Spanish orthography.)	Fuerte de la Concepción	April 3, 1986 (#86000703)	Agustín Stahl Street; 18°26′09″N 67°09′21″W	Aguadilla Pueblo	The last remaining vestiges of a colonial Spanish fort built between the 18th and 19th centuries.
7	Old Urban Cemetery	Old Urban Cemetery	January 2, 1985 (#85000042)	At the foot of Cuesta Vieja; 18°26′16″N 67°09′22″W	Aguadilla Pueblo	Historic cemetery with burials dating back to 1813 or 1814, originally divided into sections for Catholics and non-Catholics.
8	El Parterre – Ojo De Agua	El Parterre – Ojo De Agua	January 13, 1986 (#86000781)	Bounded by Muñoz Rivera, Gonzalo Firpo, José de Diego, and Mangó Streets; 18°25′55″N 67°09′15″W	Aguadilla Pueblo	Public landscaped park designed by Heinrich Hau and built an ancient water spring (ojo de agua) closely tied to the history of Aguadilla, and associated with historical figures such as Francis Drake and Fray Íñigo Abbad y Lasierra.
9	Residence Lopez (Note: The name of the Residence Lopez is presented here using word order and without the accent on "López" in conformance with the usage in the house's National Register nomination form and announcement of listing.)	Residence Lopez	January 2, 1985 (#85000043)	67 Progreso Street; 18°25′31″N 67°09′15″W	Aguadilla Pueblo	Built in 1914, this one-story, Neoclassical house is architecturally significant as a typical urban residence for a well-to-do Puerto Rican family in the early 20th century, and as one of the most important remaining works by architect Manuel Gómez Tejera.

=== Former listings ===
	Name on the Register	Image	Date listed	Date removed	Location	City or town	Description
1	Silva-Benejan House		May 20, 1987 (#87000725)	August 28, 2002	15 Muñoz Rivera Street	Aguadilla	Delisted due to procedural errors in nomination. Still listed however in the Puerto Rico Register of Historic Sites and Zones under the name "Residencia Beneján".

== Añasco ==
	Name on the Register	Image	Date listed	Location	Barrio	Description
1	Hostos–Ramírez de Arellano School District	Hostos–Ramírez de Arellano School District	October 23, 2017 (#100001762)	Calle San Antonio and Calle 65th de Infantería; 18°16′57″N 67°08′30″W	Carreras	Historic school complex built between 1903 and 1909 consisting of two distinct school buildings: Eugenio María de Hostos Graded School and the Sergio Ramírez de Arellano School.
2	Puente de Añasco	Puente de Añasco	January 18, 2011 (#11000018)	Highway 2, km 146.1; 18°16′21″N 67°09′42″W	Añasco Arriba and Sabanetas (Note: The Puente de Añasco spans the boundary between Añasco (Barrio Añasco Arriba) and Mayagüez (Barrio Sabanetas) municipalities.)	American Bridge Company-designed historic Pennsylvania through truss bridge from 1944. Also known as the Salcedo Bridge.

== Cabo Rojo ==
	Name on the Register	Image	Date listed	Location	Barrio	Description
1	Casa Vidal		January 26, 2026 (#100012628)	68 Ave. Santos Ortiz; 18°04′53″N 67°09′14″W		
2	James L. M. Curry Graded School	James L. M. Curry Graded School	December 30, 2019 (#100004855)	Calle Betances; 18°05′10″N 67°08′47″W	Cabo Rojo Pueblo	Historic school from 1903 with Neoclassical architecture. It is the oldest school in Cabo Rojo and one of the earliest schools to be built in the island during the 20th century.
3	Faro de los Morrillos de Cabo Rojo	Faro de los Morrillos de Cabo Rojo	October 22, 1981 (#81000685)	South of Pole Ojea on Cabo Rojo; 17°56′01″N 67°11′32″W	Boquerón and Llanos Costa	Historic Spanish-built lighthouse from 1882 located on a limestone cliff in a tombolo known as Los Morrillos de Cabo Rojo.
4	Punta Ostiones		August 25, 2004 (#04000908)	Address restricted (Note: Federal and state laws and practices restrict general public access to information regarding the specific location of this resource. In some cases, this is to protect archeological sites from vandalism, while in other cases it is restricted at the request of the owner.)	Miradero	Archaeological site of a large Taíno village, considered one of the type sites of the Ostionoid culture (600–1500 AD).
5	Silva Bridge	Silva Bridge	July 19, 1995 (#95000834)	Highway 114, km 4; 18°08′21″N 67°08′45″W	Guanajibo and Guanajibo (Note: The Silva Bridge spans the boundary between Hormigueros (Barrio Guanajibo) and Cabo Rojo (Barrio Guanajibo) municipalities.)	Pratt pony truss bridge from 1897 and site of a battle between Spanish and American forces during the Puerto Rico campaign of the Spanish–American War in 1898.

== Guánica ==
	Name on the Register	Image	Date listed	Location	Barrio	Description
1	Faro de Guanica (Note: The name of the Faro de Guanica is presented here without the accent on "Guánica" in conformance with the usage in the light's National Register nomination form and Federal Register announcement of listing.)	Faro de Guanica	March 28, 1977 (#77001549)	Highway 333; 17°57′03″N 66°54′11″W	Carenero	This disused and ruined lighthouse was built by Spanish authorities in 1893 in a style reminiscent of plantation great houses. It marked the entrance to Guánica Bay, the most important harbor on the southern side of the island from early colonial times through the Spanish–American War in 1898.
2	James Garfield Graded School	James Garfield Graded School	May 26, 2015 (#15000275)	65 de Infantería Street; 17°58′23″N 66°54′31″W	Guánica Pueblo	Historic school from 1903 designed in a Neoclassical style by architect Charles G. Post.
3	Hacienda Santa Rita	Hacienda Santa Rita	January 5, 1984 (#84003147)	Highway 116R, km 32.7; 18°00′27″N 66°53′03″W	Susúa Baja	Formerly known as Hacienda Desideria, former sugarcane plantation consisting of a well-preserved main house or manor and slave quarters. Used by Guy Vernor Henry as military and living quarters during the Puerto Rico campaign in 1898.
4	Yauco Battle Site	Yauco Battle Site	September 2, 2008 (#00001383)	Roughly bounded by Hacienda Santa Rita, Highways 389, 116R, 116, Loco River, and Seboruco Scarp; 18°00′03″N 66°53′16″W	Susúa Baja	Site of the Battle of Yauco in 1898, in the Spanish–American War. See Puerto Rico Campaign. The Battle field was located at the time in Yauco, however the site became part of modern day Guanica after the founding of the municipality.

== Hormigueros ==
	Name on the Register	Image	Date listed	Location	Barrio	Description
1	Casa Márquez	Casa Márquez	June 1, 2015 (#15000311)	8 Segundo Ruiz Belvis Street at Mateo Fajardo Street; 18°08′19″N 67°07′41″W	Hormigueros Pueblo	Historic well-preserved 19th-century residence and former manor house.
2	Santuario de la Monserrate de Hormigueros and Casa de Peregrinos	Santuario de la Monserrate de Hormigueros and Casa de Peregrinos	April 17, 1975 (#75002134)	1 Peregrinos Street and Highway 344; 18°08′26″N 67°07′38″W	Hormigueros Pueblo	Historic pilgrimage church and Marian shrine to the Virgin of Montserrat closely tied to the folklore and history of Hormigueros. Records of the church date to as far as 1590 and radiocarbon dating suggests that a chapel has existed in the site since at least 1570. The site includes a pilgrimage house and rectory.
3	Silva Bridge	Silva Bridge	July 19, 1995 (#95000834)	Highway 114, km 4; 18°08′21″N 67°08′45″W	Guanajibo and Guanajibo	Pratt pony truss bridge from 1897 and site of a battle between Spanish and American forces during the Puerto Rico campaign of the Spanish–American War in 1898.
4	Torréns Bridge (Note: The name of the Torrens Bridge is presented here without the accent on "Torréns" in conformance with the usage in the bridge's National Register nomination form and announcement of listing.)	Torréns Bridge	May 11, 2000 (#00000423)	Highway 319, km 1.5; 18°07′36″N 67°07′24″W	Hormigueros and Benavente	This 1878 beam bridge with lattice girders and transverse joists has an engineering design unique in the United States. Built to support local economic development, it was later captured by the U.S. Army in 1898 as part of Battle of Hormigueros during the Spanish–American War.

== Lajas ==
	Name on the Register	Image	Date listed	Location	Barrio	Description
1	Luis Muñoz Rivera School	Luis Muñoz Rivera School	December 19, 2012 (#12001076)	Junction of 65 de Infantería and M. Dávila Streets; 18°02′52″N 67°03′33″W	Lajas Pueblo	Beaux Arts/Mission/Spanish Revival school from 1926 exemplary of early 20th-century school architecture in Puerto Rico and beyond.
2	Oliver Hazard Perry Graded School	Oliver Hazard Perry Graded School	December 13, 2016 (#16000852)	Junction of San Blas and Concordia Streets; 18°03′01″N 67°03′35″W	Lajas Pueblo	Classical Revival school built between 1904 and 1907, the oldest school building in Lajas.

== Mayagüez ==
	Name on the Register	Image	Date listed	Location	Barrio	Description
1	Asilo de Pobres	Asilo de Pobres	December 2, 1985 (#85003087)	Post Street; 18°11′46″N 67°08′33″W	Mayagüez Pueblo	A former municipal homeless asylum, designed in Classical Revival architecture by architects Manuel V. Domenech and Luis Perocier, and built in 1920.
2	Casa Consistorial de Mayagüez (Note: The name of the Casa Consistorial De Mayaguez is presented here with a capital D and without the diaresis on "Mayagüez" in conformance with the usage in the building's National Register nomination form and announcement of listing.)	Casa Consistorial de Mayagüez	December 2, 1985 (#85003046)	Peral Street; 18°12′04″N 67°08′23″W	Mayagüez Pueblo	Historic city hall designed by Rafael Carmoega and Font Giménez and built by Ignacio Flowers Lorenzo in 1926.
3	Cementerio Municipal de Mayagüez	Cementerio Municipal de Mayagüez	August 25, 1988 (#88001247)	Southern end of Post Street; 18°11′29″N 67°08′32″W	Mayagüez Pueblo	Historic Classical Revival cemetery from 1876 designed as part of the 1804 Mayagüez urban master plan by Félix Vidal d’Ors. As many historic cemeteries in Puerto Rico it used to be divided into Catholic and non-Catholic sections.
4	Duran Esmoris Residence	Duran Esmoris Residence	September 7, 1988 (#88000655)	Méndez Vigo Street; 18°12′16″N 67°08′44″W	Mayagüez Pueblo	Bungalow or Craftsman building from 1921, designed by Luis Fernando Nieva.
5	Edificio José de Diego (Note: The name of the Edificio Jose de Diego is presented here without the accent on "José" in conformance with the usage in the building's National Register nomination form and Federal Register announcement of listing.)	Edificio José de Diego	November 18, 1977 (#77001553)	University of Puerto Rico at Mayagüez campus 18°12′33″N 67°08′29″W	Mayagüez Pueblo	Central administration building of the University of Puerto Rico at Mayagüez, built in 1913.
6	Faro de la Isla de la Mona	Faro de la Isla de la Mona	October 22, 1981 (#81000689)	East side of Mona Island; 18°05′12″N 67°50′48″W	Isla de Mona e Islote Monito	Historic lighthouse designed in 1885 by Spanish engineer Rafael Ravena and built in 1900, and the first of two lighthouses built by the United States government in Puerto Rico. The lighthouse is famous for its intricate designed, formerly attributed to Gustav Eiffel, and is considered one of the most endangered lighthouses in the U.S. It was served by a long narrow-gauge tramway.
7	Gómez Residence (Note: The name of the Gomez Residencia is presented here using word order that conforms to the usage in the house's National Register announcement of listing and subsequent database entries. The accent is omitted from "Gómez" in conformance with both of those sources as well as the house's National Register nomination form.)	Gómez Residence	June 15, 1988 (#88000656)	60 Méndez Vigo Street; 18°12′09″N 67°08′37″W	Mayagüez Pueblo	Mission/Spanish Revival, neo-Andalusí style building from 1933 designed by architect Francisco Porrata Doria.
8	Isla de Mona	Isla de Mona	December 17, 1993 (#93001398)	Mona Island; 18°05′12″N 67°53′22″W	Isla de Mona e Islote Monito	The historic district includes a number of Pre-Columbian archaeological sites including the Corral de los Indios and Bajura de los Cerezos bateyes, several sites with prehistoric rock art, and the Mona Island Lighthouse.
9	Casa Solariega de José de Diego (Note: The name of La Casa Solariega de Jose De Diego is presented here with a capital D in the second "de" and without the accent on "José" in conformance with the usage in the house's National Register nomination form and announcement of listing.)		April 3, 1986 (#86000624)	52 Liceo Street; 18°12′00″N 67°08′08″W	Mayagüez Pueblo	Also known as Lería Esmoris Residence, historic house designed by Sabàs Honoré in 1890 and built in 1897 for Santiago Sáenz y Martínez who later passed it to José de Diego.
10	Logia Adelphia	Logia Adelphia	February 19, 1986 (#86000323)	64E Sol Street; 18°12′01″N 67°08′20″W	Mayagüez Pueblo	Historic Masonic lodge from 1912, designed by Sabàs Honoré.
11	Nazario Rivera Residence (Note: The name of the Nazario Rivera Residencia is presented here using word order (name preceding "Residencia") that conforms to the usage in the house's National Register announcement of listing and subsequent database entries.)	Nazario Rivera Residence	September 13, 1988 (#88000686)	105 Post Street; 18°11′55″N 67°08′29″W	Mayagüez Pueblo	Historic house from 1872, designed by Joaquín Hernández.
12	Plaza Publica (Note: The name of the Plaza Publica is presented here without the accent on "Pública" in conformance with the usage in the plaza's National Register nomination form and announcement of listing.)	Plaza Publica	December 3, 1985 (#85003085)	Candelaria Street; 18°12′04″N 67°08′21″W	Mayagüez Pueblo	Main town square or plaza of the city of Mayagüez, built in 1760 following the traditional Spanish urban planning conventions in the island. The current plaza design dates to 1842, a year after the Great Fire of 1841 destroyed much of the city.
13	Puente de Añasco	Puente de Añasco	January 18, 2011 (#11000018)	Highway 2, km 146.1; 18°16′21″N 67°09′42″W	Sabanetas and Añasco Arriba	Historic Pennsylvania through truss bridge from 1944. Also known as the Salcedo Bridge.
14	Ramírez Fuentes Residence (Note: The name of the Ramírez Fuentes Residencia is presented here using word order (name preceding "Residencia") that conforms to the usage in the house's National Register announcement of listing and subsequent database entries. Also note that while the announcement and databases treat Ramirez as a forename and Fuentes as a surname and omit the accent from Ramírez, the house's National Register nomination form treats Ramírez Fuentes, including the accent, as a compound surname (section 9 mentions "Mrs. Mirta Ramírez de Fuentes"); for these purposes, this article adopts the nomination's usage.)	Ramírez Fuentes Residence	July 12, 1988 (#88000965)	117 Méndez Vigo Street; 18°12′06″N 67°08′12″W	Mayagüez Pueblo	Bungalow/Craftsman building from 1925, designed by Pascasio Fajardo.
15	Residencia Heygler	Residencia Heygler	July 12, 1988 (#88000962)	51 Liceo Street; 18°12′01″N 67°08′07″W	Mayagüez Pueblo	Historic building from 1830.
16	Residencia Ramirez De Arellano en Guanajibo (Note: The name of the Residencia Ramirez De Arellano en Guanajibo is presented here with a capital D and without the accent on "Ramírez" in conformance with the usage in the house's National Register nomination form and announcement of listing.)		February 5, 1987 (#86003192)	Highway 102; 18°10′19″N 67°10′38″W	Guanajibo	Plantation style building from 1930.
17	Teatro Yagüez (Note: The name of the Teatro Yaguez is presented here without the diaresis on "Yagüez" in conformance with the usage in the theater's National Register nomination form and announcement of listing.)	Teatro Yagüez	December 2, 1985 (#85003086)	Junction of Candelaria and Basora Streets; 18°12′04″N 67°08′25″W	Mayagüez Pueblo	Historic building from 1909, although now functioning as a theater, it is the oldest purpose-built movie theater in Puerto Rico. It designed by Sabàs Honoré and built by Francisco Maymón Palmer.
18	U.S. Custom House	U.S. Custom House	February 10, 1988 (#88000076)	Junction of Candelaria Street and José González Clemente Avenue; 18°12′23″N 67°09′05″W	Mayagüez Pueblo	Historic Beaux-arts government building from 1838, redesigned by Rafael Carmoega in 1924.
19	U.S. Post Office and Courthouse	U.S. Post Office and Courthouse	May 21, 1986 (#86001169)	Junction of Candelaria and Pilar DeFillo Streets; 18°12′06″N 67°08′38″W	Mayagüez Pueblo	Historic post office designed by Louis A. Simpson in 1935, built at the site of the former military barracks of the Alfonso XII Regiment.

=== Former listings ===
	Name on the Register	Image	Date listed	Date removed	Location	City or town	Description
1	Antiqua Residencia de la Familia Nadal		December 19, 1986 (#86003505)	November 26, 1990	13 Dr. Barbosa S	Mayagüez	Delisted due to procedural errors in the nomination.
2	Baldomero Baunin Residence		April 5, 1988 (#88000687)	November 26, 1990	Calle Ramos Antonini No. 62	Mayagüez	Delisted due to procedural errors in the nomination.

== Moca ==
	Name on the Register	Image	Date listed	Location	Barrio	Description
1	Hacienda Enriqueta	Hacienda Enriqueta	May 29, 2024 (#100010389)	Carretera Estatal PR-125, Km. 0.9; 18°23′51″N 67°07′33″W	Moca vicinity	Well-preserved former hacienda from 1884 named after Enriqueta Nicanora, daughter of German-Puerto Rican Gohan Heinrich Wilhem Kleinbring, who immigrated to Puerto Rico to work at Central Coloso. Today a museum.
2	Hacienda Iruena Manor House	Hacienda Iruena Manor House	August 14, 1987 (#87000735)	Highway 2, km 115.7; 18°27′11″N 67°03′41″W	Aceitunas	Renaissance/French Chateau style building from 1893, popularly known as the Labadié Castle or as Palacete Los Moreau, after the famed piece of Puerto Rican literature by Enrique Laguerre. The manor house is the only remaining structure of a former mixed sugarcane and coffee plantation.

== Rincón ==
	Name on the Register	Image	Date listed	Location	Barrio	Description
1	Boiling Nuclear Superheater (BONUS) Reactor Facility	Boiling Nuclear Superheater (BONUS) Reactor Facility	November 14, 2007 (#07001194)	End of Branch 4413, Highway 413; 18°21′55″N 67°16′07″W	Puntas	Decommissioned boiling-water nuclear reactor built by the Chicago Bridge & Iron Company, one of the two superheater reactors of its type ever built in the United States.
2	Faro de Punta Higüero	Faro de Punta Higüero	October 22, 1981 (#81000560)	Branch 4413, Highway 413; 18°21′43″N 67°16′15″W	Puntas	Historic lighthouse built by the Spanish government in 1892 and later electrified by the United States Coast Guard in 1922 and automated in 1933.

== Sabana Grande ==
	Name on the Register	Image	Date listed	Location	Barrio	Description
1	Cementerio Masónico de la Resp. Logia Igualdad Núm. 23 de Sabana Grande	Cementerio Masónico de la Resp. Logia Igualdad Núm. 23 de Sabana Grande	February 13, 2013 (#13000014)	Junction of Highway 121 and Street 1; 18°04′46″N 66°58′02″W	Santana	Historic 19th-century Masonic cemetery.
2	Church of San Isidro Labrador and Santa María de la Cabeza of Sabana Grande	Church of San Isidro Labrador and Santa María de la Cabeza of Sabana Grande	December 10, 1984 (#84000460)	Ángel G. Martínez Street, Town Plaza; 18°04′46″N 66°57′34″W	Sabana Grande Pueblo	Spanish Colonial church from 1844.
3	James Fenimore Cooper Graded School	James Fenimore Cooper Graded School	May 26, 2015 (#15000277)	20 San Isidro Street at Luis Muñoz Rivera Street; 18°04′46″N 66°57′32″W	Sabana Grande Pueblo	Historic school from 1903 designed by Charles G. Post.
4	Hacienda San Francisco	Hacienda San Francisco	April 7, 1995 (#95000287)	Callejón de la Hacienda; 18°04′34″N 66°57′45″W	Rayo	Former sugarcane mill complex and manor house from 1871.
5	Lassise–Schettini House		October 21, 1987 (#87001823)	End of Ángel Martínez Street; 18°05′02″N 66°57′33″W	Santana	Prairie School house designed by Luis Perocier and built for Dr. Enrique Lassise in 1924.
6	Berta Sepulveda House (Note: The name of the Berta Sepulveda House is presented here without the accent on "Sepúlveda" in conformance with the usage in the house's National Register nomination form and announcement of listing.)	Berta Sepulveda House	June 17, 1994 (#94000624)	37 Luis Muñoz Rivera Street; 18°04′43″N 66°57′34″W	Sabana Grande Pueblo	Historic house designed by Rafael Bofill in 1926.

== San Germán ==
	Name on the Register	Image	Date listed	Location	Barrio	Description
1	Jaime Acosta y Fores Residence (Note: The name of the Jaime Acosta y Fores Residence is presented here without the accent on "Forés" in conformance with the usage in the house's National Register nomination form and announcement of listing.)	Jaime Acosta y Fores Residence	May 24, 1990 (#90000767)	70 Dr. Santiago Veve Street; 18°04′54″N 67°02′25″W	San Germán Pueblo	Vernacular Criollo house built in 1917.
2	Alcantarilla Pluvial sobre la Quebrada Manzanares	Alcantarilla Pluvial sobre la Quebrada Manzanares	April 12, 1990 (#90000552)	Extending from approximately the junction of Ferrocarril and Esperanza Streets to approximately the junction of Javilla and Ensanche Streets (Note: The Alcantarilla Pluvial sobre la Quebrada Manzanares is a linear resource; the coordinates given represent the approximate midpoint of the line.); 18°04′54″N 67°02′33″W	San Germán Pueblo	Brick and rubble storm sewer system built in 1835 spanning the subterranean length of Manzanares Creek under San Germán.
3	Casa de los Ponce de León (Note: The name of the Casa de los Ponce de Leon is presented here without the accent on "León" in conformance with the usage in the house's National Register nomination form and announcement of listing.)	Casa de los Ponce de León	March 9, 1983 (#83002295)	13 Dr. Santiago Veve Street; 18°04′56″N 67°02′42″W	San Germán Pueblo	Possibly the oldest single-family residence in Puerto Rico, historically owned by the Ponce de León family and associated with poet and abolitionist Lola Rodríguez de Tió.
4	Church San Germán Auxerre of San Germán	Church San Germán Auxerre of San Germán	December 10, 1984 (#84000461)	De la Cruz Street; 18°04′57″N 67°02′38″W	San Germán Pueblo	Historic church built in 1688 famous for its well-preserved altar piece, its trompe-l'œil decorations and its paintings by José Campeche.
5	Convento de Porta Coeli	Convento de Porta Coeli	September 8, 1976 (#76002252)	Plaza Porta Coeli; 18°04′55″N 67°02′28″W	San Germán Pueblo	Historic chapel of the former Santo Domingo de Porta Coeli Dominican Convent from 1609, making it one of the oldest church buildings in the Western Hemisphere.
6	Hacienda Buena Unión (Note: The name of Hacienda Buena Union is presented here without the accent on "Unión" in conformance with the usage in the hacienda's National Register nomination form and announcement of listing.)		August 23, 1983 (#83002296)	Highway 362, km 3.0; 18°05′19″N 67°00′49″W	Guamá	Former sugarcane plantation from 1870 known for its trapiche. Also known as Hacienda Acosta.
7	Observation Tower	Observation Tower	May 1, 2016 (#16000236)	Highway 120, km 14; 18°08′40″N 66°58′48″W	Caín Alto	Observation tower built in 1940 at the summit of Santa Ana Peak in the Maricao State Forest by the Civilian Conservation Corps in the Bungalow/Craftsman style.
8	San Germán Historic District	San Germán Historic District	February 16, 1994 (#94000084)	Roughly bounded by Luna, Estrella, Concepción, Javilla, and Ferrocarril Streets; 18°04′55″N 67°02′38″W	San Germán Pueblo (Note: A minor portion of the San Germán Historic District extends into Barrio Sabana Grande Abajo.)	Colonial historic center of the town of San Germán, founded as Nueva Salamanca by Spanish settlers in 1573, making it the second oldest European-established settlement in the island after San Juan. In addition to its contributing properties it contains more than 100 architecturally and historically significant buildings, many of which date to at least 1606.

== See also ==
- National Register of Historic Places listings in Puerto Rico
- Historic preservation
- History of Puerto Rico
- National Register of Historic Places listings in southern Puerto Rico
- National Register of Historic Places listings in northern Puerto Rico
- National Register of Historic Places listings in eastern Puerto Rico
- National Register of Historic Places listings in central Puerto Rico
- National Register of Historic Places listings in San Juan, Puerto Rico
