= López Residence =

Historic house in Aguadilla, Puerto Rico

- Residence Lopez (Note: The house's name is presented here using word order and without the accent on "López" in conformance with the usage in the house's National Register nomination form and announcement of listing.)
- U.S. National Register of Historic Places
- Puerto Rico Historic Sites and Zones
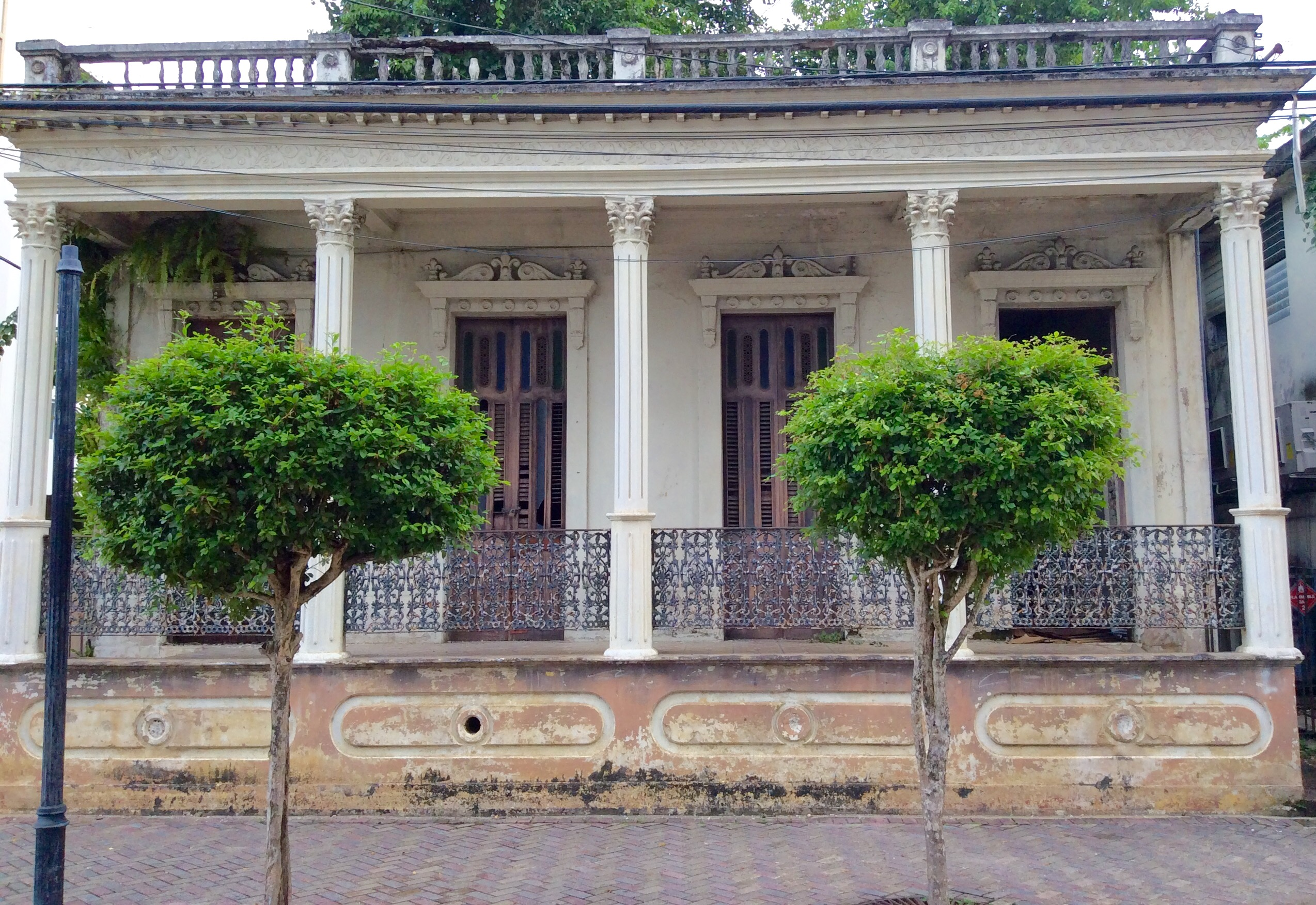

- Location within Puerto Rico
- Location: 67 Progreso Street; Aguadilla, Puerto Rico
- Coordinates: 18°25′31″N 67°09′15″W
- Area: 206 m^{2} (2,220 sq ft)
- Built: 1914
- Built by: Juan Cedillo (Note: The house's National Register nomination form also mentions Juan C. Sánchez, possibly as a builder or architect, but is not specific regarding Sánchez's role with regard to the house.)
- Architect: Manuel Gómez Tejera
- Architectural style: Neoclassical
- NRHP reference No.: 85000043
- RNSZH No.: 2000-(RO)-19-JP-SH

Significant dates
- Added to NRHP: January 2, 1985
- Designated RNSZH: December 21, 2000

The López Residence (Spanish: Residencia López) is a historic house in Aguadilla, Puerto Rico. Built in 1914, this one-story, Neoclassical structure is architecturally significant as a typical urban residence for a well-to-do Puerto Rican family in the early 20th century, and as one of the most important remaining works by architect Manuel Gómez Tejera. Notable architectural elements of the house include its five slender, octagonal Corinthian columns, recessed ceiling panels on the balcony, ornate cast-iron balcony ornamentation, native ceramic tile floors, rooftop balcony, four louvered wooden doors with scrollwork frames facing the street, and filigreed interior arches supported by turned and octagonal columns. It faces the 1925 District Courthouse across Progreso Street, forming a historic Neoclassical set.

The house was listed on the U.S. National Register of Historic Places in 1985, and on the Puerto Rico Register of Historic Sites and Zones in 2000 under the name Herreras López Family Residence (residencia de los Herreras López).

== See also ==
- National Register of Historic Places listings in Aguadilla, Puerto Rico
