= James Fenimore Cooper Graded School =

- U.S. National Register of Historic Places
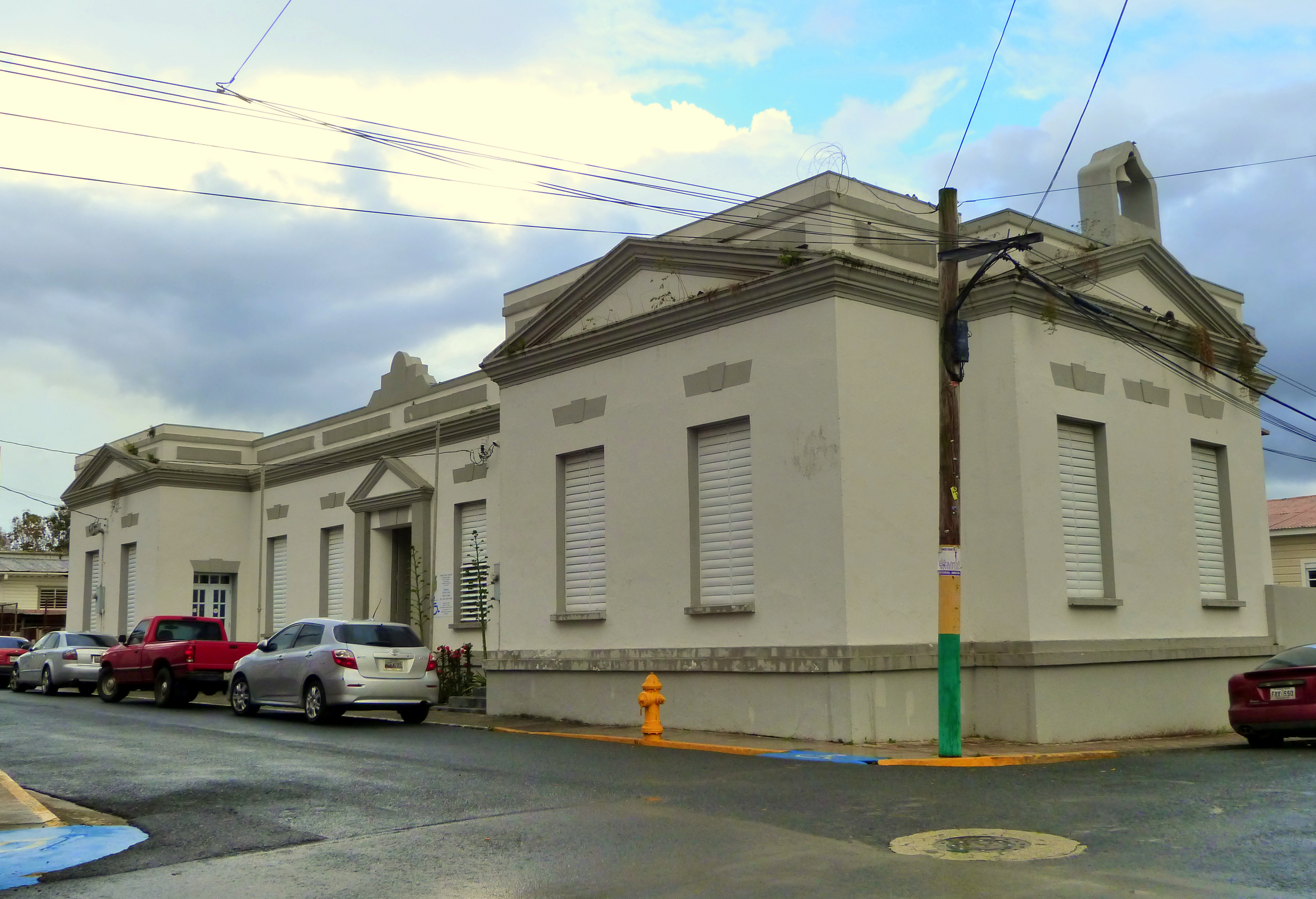
- James Fenimore Cooper School in 2017

- Location within Puerto Rico
- Location: 20 San Isidro Street at Luis Muñoz Rivera Street Sabana Grande, Puerto Rico
- Coordinates: 18°04′46″N 66°57′32″W
- Built: 1903
- Architect: Charles G. Post
- Architectural style: Classical Revival
- MPS: Early Twentieth Century Schools in Puerto Rico
- NRHP reference No.: 15000277
- Added to NRHP: May 26, 2015

James Fenimore Cooper Graded School (Spanish: Escuela James Fenimore Cooper) is a historic school located in Sabana Grande Pueblo, the administrative and historic center of the municipality of Sabana Grande, Puerto Rico. The school is located across from the main town square (plaza pública) and church of Sabana Grande. It was designed by Charles G. Post in the Neoclassical style, popular in the architecture of early 20th-century schoolhouses and built in 1903. It was the first institution to be built in the town of Sabana Grande under the new U.S. colonial administration.

== See also ==
- National Register of Historic Places listings in western Puerto Rico
