= Berta Sepúlveda House =

House in Sabana Grande, Puerto Rico

- Berta Sepulveda House
- U.S. National Register of Historic Places
- Puerto Rico Historic Sites and Zones
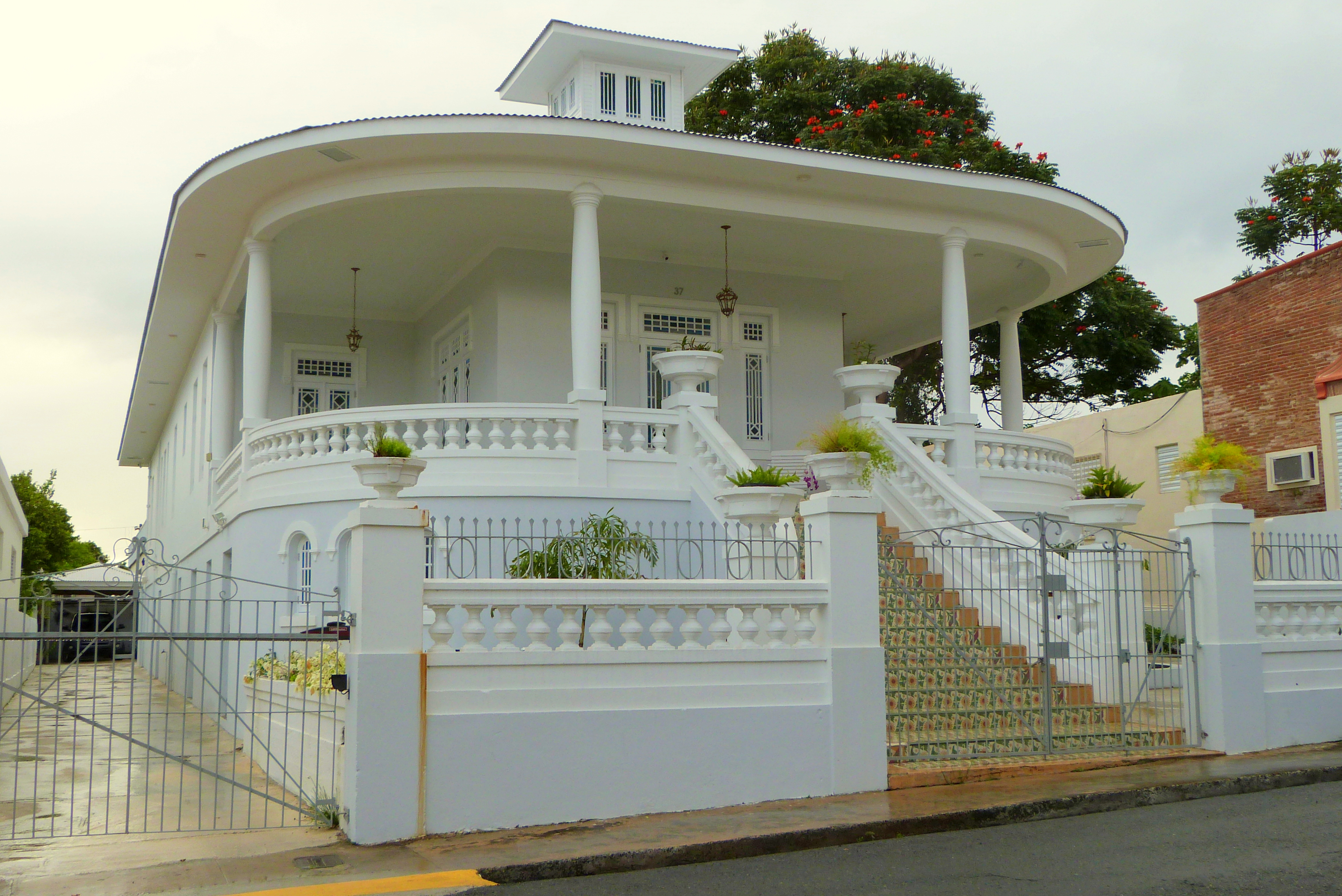
- Sepulveda House in 2017.

- Location within Puerto Rico
- Location: 37 Luis Muñoz Rivera Street Sabana Grande, Puerto Rico
- Coordinates: 18°04′43″N 66°57′34″W
- Built: 1927
- Architect: Rafael Bofill
- Architectural style: Eclectic Vernacular
- NRHP reference No.: 94000624
- RNSZH No.: 2000-(RO)-19-JP-SH

Significant dates
- Added to NRHP: June 17, 1994
- Designated RNSZH: December 21, 2000

The Berta Sepúlveda House (Spanish: Casa Berta Sepúlveda) is a historic residence located in Sabana Grande Pueblo, the administrative and historic center of the municipality of Sabana Grande, Puerto Rico. It was designed by Mayagüez-native self-made architect Rafael Bofill and built between 1926 and 1927 in a traditional vernacular style with elements inspired by the newly emerging Modern architecture, particularly the Prairie-style. Its most distinctive feature is its wide curved balcony with its Tuscan-style columns. It was added to the National Register of Historic Places in 1994 and on the Puerto Rico Register of Historic Sites and Zones in 2000.

== See also ==
- National Register of Historic Places listings in western Puerto Rico
