= Residencia Ramirez De Arellano en Guanajibo =

- U.S. National Register of Historic Places
- Puerto Rico Historic Sites and Zones
- Location within Puerto Rico
- Location: PR-102 Mayagüez, Puerto Rico
- Coordinates: 18°10′17″N 67°10′34″W
- Built: 1930
- Architectural style: Plantation-style
- NRHP reference No.: 86003192
- RNSZH No.: 2000-(RO)-19-JP-SH

Significant dates
- Added to NRHP: February 5, 1987
- Designated RNSZH: December 21, 2000

The Ramírez de Arellano Residence (Spanish: Residencia Ramírez de Arellano) is a historic house located in the Guanajibo area of the municipality of Mayagüez, Puerto Rico. It is listed in the National Register of Historic Places as the Residencia Ramírez de Arellano in Guanajibo to disambiguate it from other residences historically owned by the Ramírez de Arellano family such as the Subirá Residence in Ponce and the Alfredo Ramírez de Arellano y Rosell House (now the Rosell House Museum) in San Germán.

The residence was formerly a beach house and the centerpiece of a vast estate on the southern skirts of Mayagüez which used to be owned by banker and politician Don Alfredo Ramírez de Arellano y Rosell. He was a member of the Ramírez de Arellano family and founder of the Hacienda Igualdad, a 1925 sugarcane plantation and mill which used to be one of the largest of its type in Puerto Rico at the time. The vacation home was notable as being one of the earliest and best examples of Revival plantation-style residences in the island during the first half of the 20th century.

== See also ==
- National Register of Historic Places listings in western Puerto Rico
