= Hacienda Buena Unión =

- Hacienda Buena Union (Note: The name of the hacienda is presented here without the accent on "Unión" in conformance with the usage in the hacienda's National Register nomination form and announcement of listing.)
- U.S. National Register of Historic Places
- Puerto Rico Historic Sites and Zones
- Location within Puerto Rico
- Location: Highway 362, km 3.0; Barrio Guamá; San Germán municipality Puerto Rico
- Coordinates: 18°05′19″N 67°00′49″W
- Built: 1870
- NRHP reference No.: 83002296
- RNSZH No.: 2000-(RO)-19-JP-SH

Significant dates
- Added to NRHP: August 23, 1983
- Designated RNSZH: December 21, 2000

Hacienda Buena Unión in the municipality of San Germán, Puerto Rico was built in 1870. It is also known as Trapiche del Guamá or Hacienda Acosta.

The hacienda was listed on the U.S. National Register of Historic Places in 1983 and on the Puerto Rico Register of Historic Sites and Zones in 2000.

== See also ==
- National Register of Historic Places listings in San Germán, Puerto Rico
