= Cardona Residence =

Historic house in Aguadilla, Puerto Rico

- U.S. National Register of Historic Places
- Puerto Rico Historic Sites and Zones
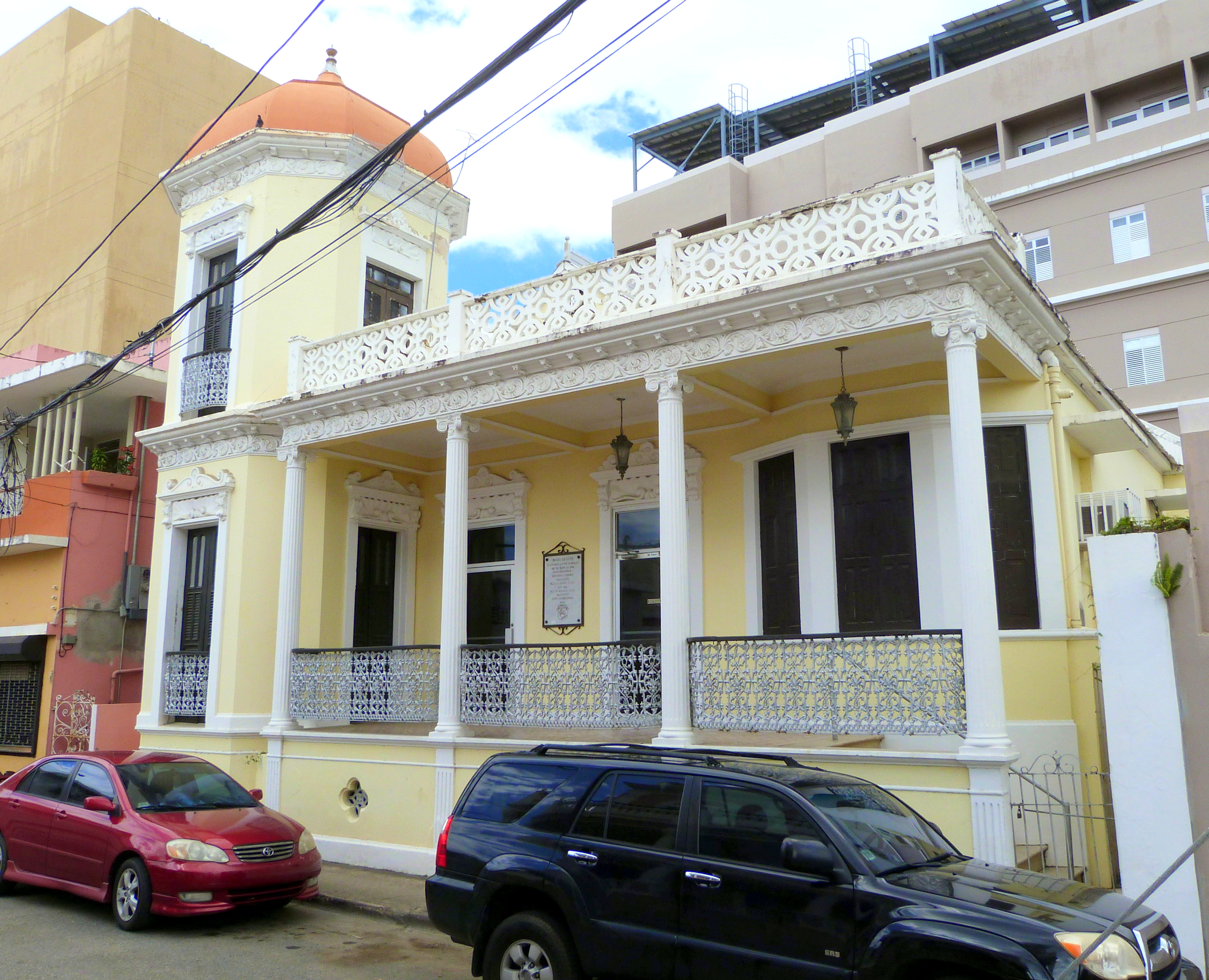
- The Cardona Residence in 2017

- Location within Puerto Rico
- Location: 55 Ramón E. Betances Street; Aguadilla, Puerto Rico
- Coordinates: 18°25′45″N 67°09′17″W
- Area: 260 m^{2} (2,800 sq ft)
- Built: 1913
- Architect: Manuel Gómez Tejera
- Architectural style: Neoclassical
- NRHP reference No.: 85000040
- RNSZH No.: 2000-(RO)-19-JP-SH

Significant dates
- Added to NRHP: January 2, 1985
- Designated RNSZH: December 21, 2000

The Cardona Residence (Residencia Cardona) is a historic house in Aguadilla, Puerto Rico. It was built in 1913. It is "one of the most interesting and best preserved" houses in Aguadilla from its era.

The house was listed on the U.S. National Register of Historic Places in 1985, and on the Puerto Rico Register of Historic Sites and Zones in 2000. In 2005 it was acquired as the new home of the Museum of Art of Aguadilla and the Caribbean. It remains in use by the museum as of 2016.

== Gallery ==
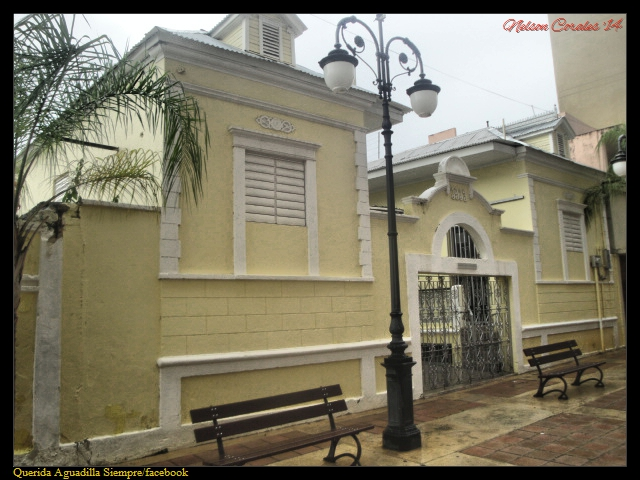
Residencia Cardona, 2014

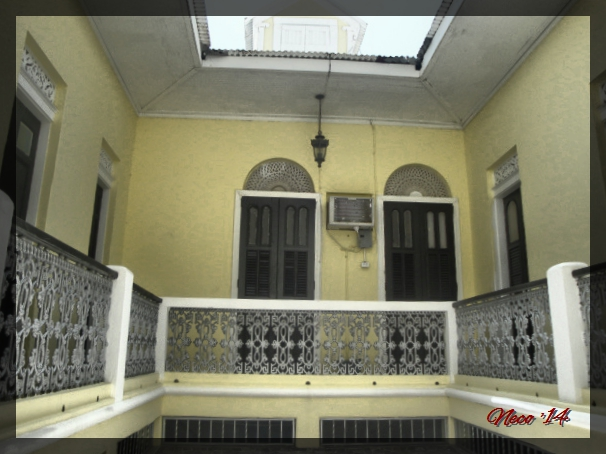
Interior view of Residencia Cardona

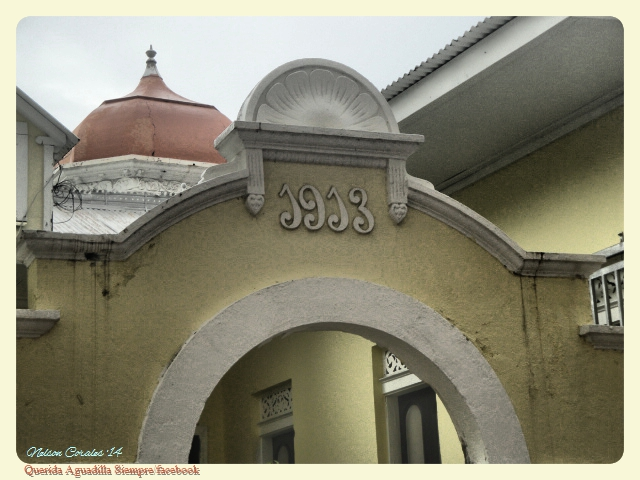
Year when residence was built indicated on back of house

== See also ==
- National Register of Historic Places listings in Aguadilla, Puerto Rico
