= Jaime Acosta y Fores Residence =

Historic house in San Germán, Puerto Rico

- U.S. National Register of Historic Places
- U.S. Historic district – Contributing property
- Location within Puerto Rico
- Location: 70 Dr. Santiago Veve Street San Germán, Puerto Rico
- Coordinates: 18°04′54″N 67°02′25″W
- Built: 1917
- Architect: Luis Pardo
- Architectural style: Criollo Vernacular
- Part of: San Germán Historic District
- NRHP reference No.: 90000767
- Added to NRHP: May 24, 1990

The Jaime Acosta y Fores Residence (Spanish: Residencia Jaime Acosta y Fores), also known as the Doña Delia Acosta House (Casa Doña Delia Acosta), is a historic vernacular Creole residence located in the historic center (pueblo) of the municipality of San Germán, Puerto Rico. The house was built in 1917 in the traditional Spanish Creole-inspired vernacular style that was popular during the late 19th and early 20th centuries in Puerto Rico. It was designed by architect and engineer Luis Pardo for Jaime Acosta y Fores, a wealthy sugarcane plantation owner who built it for his wife Delia López as a wedding gift. The interior of the house was much less traditional, integrating influences from styles such as Art Nouveau. The structure was added to the National Register of Historic Places in 1990 as it is well-preserved and has suffered no significant modifications throughout the years.

== See also ==
- National Register of Historic Places listings in western Puerto Rico
  - San Germán Historic District
