= Casa Márquez =

Historic house in Hormigueros, Puerto Rico

- Casa Marquez
- U.S. National Register of Historic Places
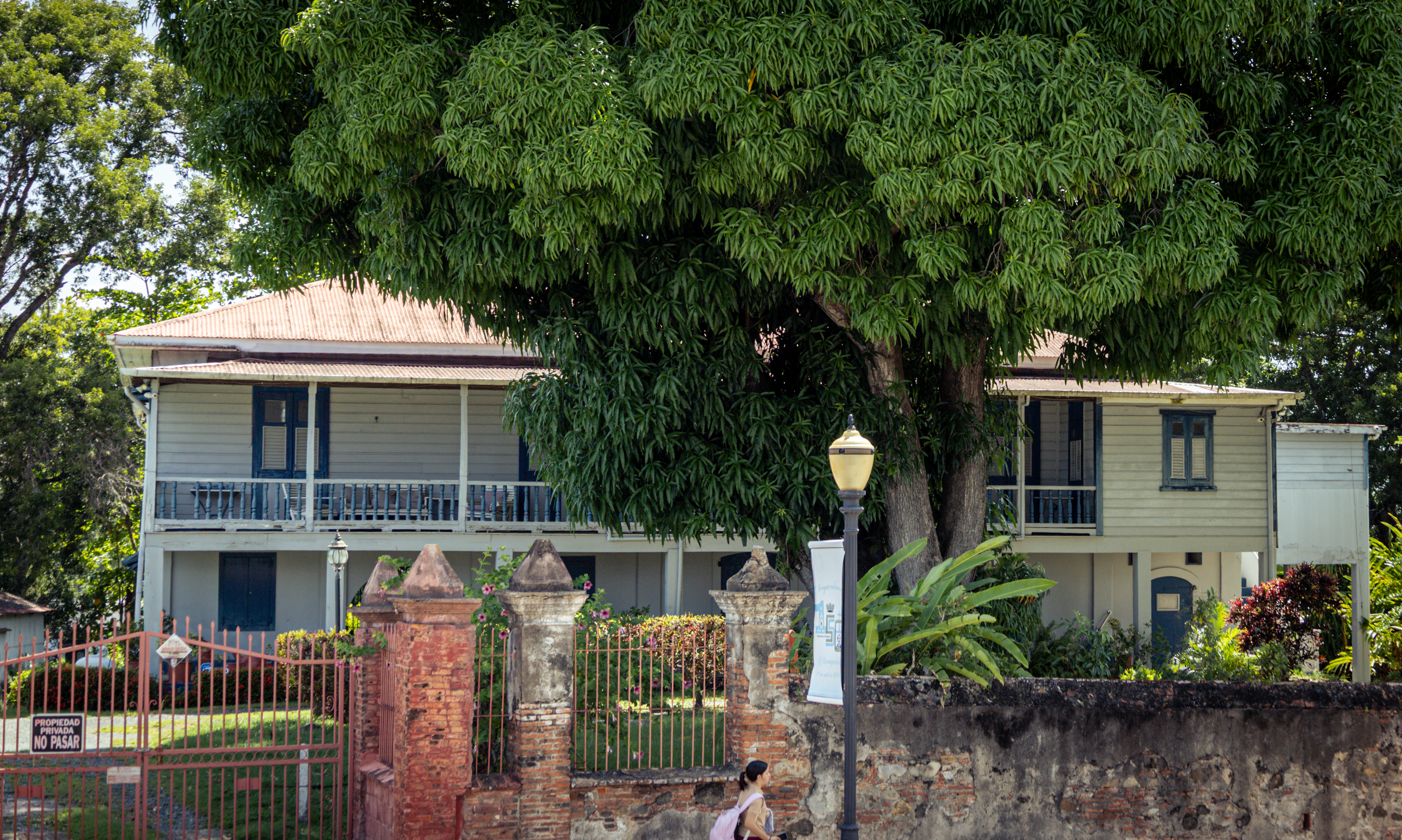
- The property in 2025

- Location within Puerto Rico
- Location: 8 Segundo Ruiz Belvis Street at Mateo Fajardo Street, Hormigueros, Puerto Rico
- Coordinates: 18°08′19″N 67°07′41″W
- Built: 1823
- NRHP reference No.: 15000311
- Added to NRHP: June 1, 2015

Casa Márquez is a historic manor house located in Hormigueros Pueblo, the administrative and historic center of the municipality of Hormigueros, Puerto Rico. The manor house dates to at least 1823 when it was built at the site of plantation and hacienda, with modifications being made in 1885 and 1935. The manor house is one of the best-preserved houses of its kind in the island and it has been owned by the local Márquez family for six generations. It was added to the National Register of Historic Places in 2015.

== History ==
When it was first built in the early 19th-century, Casa Márquez was located in the outskirts of the town of Hormigueros, one of the most important pilgrimage locations in Puerto Rico since the 17th century. The house itself was considered a landmark by the pilgrims on their way to the shrine. The manor itself was built in 1823, at the site of an hacienda dating to at least 1780–1789. The house was built for Giuseppe Marciani (transcribed into Spanish as José Marciani), founder and owner of the hacienda and an immigrant from Genoa, Italy. Marciani was one of the many non-Spanish immigrants to Puerto Rico that were attracted to the island as a result of the 1815 Royal Decree of Graces which encouraged Europeans from any background to immigrate to the Spanish Caribbean as long as they were Roman Catholic. The manor house was built in a strategic location of the former carretera real or military road (today PR-2) that connected Hormigueros and Mayagüez to San Germán, the largest town in the region at the time. It was built in the local vernacular style with elements inspired in the so-called Medieval Spanish casa-torre or casa-fuerte type of construction that inspired most of the early residential Spanish-built constructions of Puerto Rico.

In addition to the manor house and the plantation, the hacienda included bohios that served as slave quarters and industrial quarters that included a trapiche and a sugar mill. Marciani died in 1856 and with the abolition of slavery the sugarcane industry had a rapid decline by the end of the 19th century. The former slave workforce was hired by María Margarita, who became the sole owner of the hacienda until her death in 1885, when the plantation and house were bought by María Luisa del Carmen Capurro Marchany and her husband Narciso Deulofeu Serra, a newly arrived immigrant from Catalonia. Deulofeu Serra invested in modernizing the property between 1885 and 1886 which soon turned the hacienda in one of the most productive in the region despite the regional decline in the sugarcane industry in the aftermath of the abolition. During this time the hacienda also diversified its agricultural production to coffee, cotton and other important edible crops in order to expand its industrial output.

A large portion of Hacienda Valentina, the name given to the property during the time, was expropriated in 1892 during the construction of the railway and the Hormigueros station. The station although abandoned can still be found in the vicinity of the house today. After the Spanish-American War, the hacienda reverted its former sole production to sugarcane in the wake of a series of investments by the United States to create modern sugar mills and expand sugar production in the island. The impact of Hurricane San Ciriaco in 1899 however caused much damage to the property as it did to many agricultural properties throughout the island. The hacienda finally closed in the beginning of the 20th century and Casa Márquez became solely a residence now owned by the Márquez family. Deeds and demographic records of the time also show that the house was inhabited by other families such as the descendants of Deulofeu Serra, many of whom became part of the Márquez family itself, and by descendants of the former slaves who used to work in the plantation. Despite the closure of the hacienda, the manor house became an important architectural, historical and cultural landmark in Hormigueros. It was added to the National Register of Historic Places in 2015.

== See also ==
- National Register of Historic Places listings in western Puerto Rico
