= Río Rosario =

River of Puerto Rico

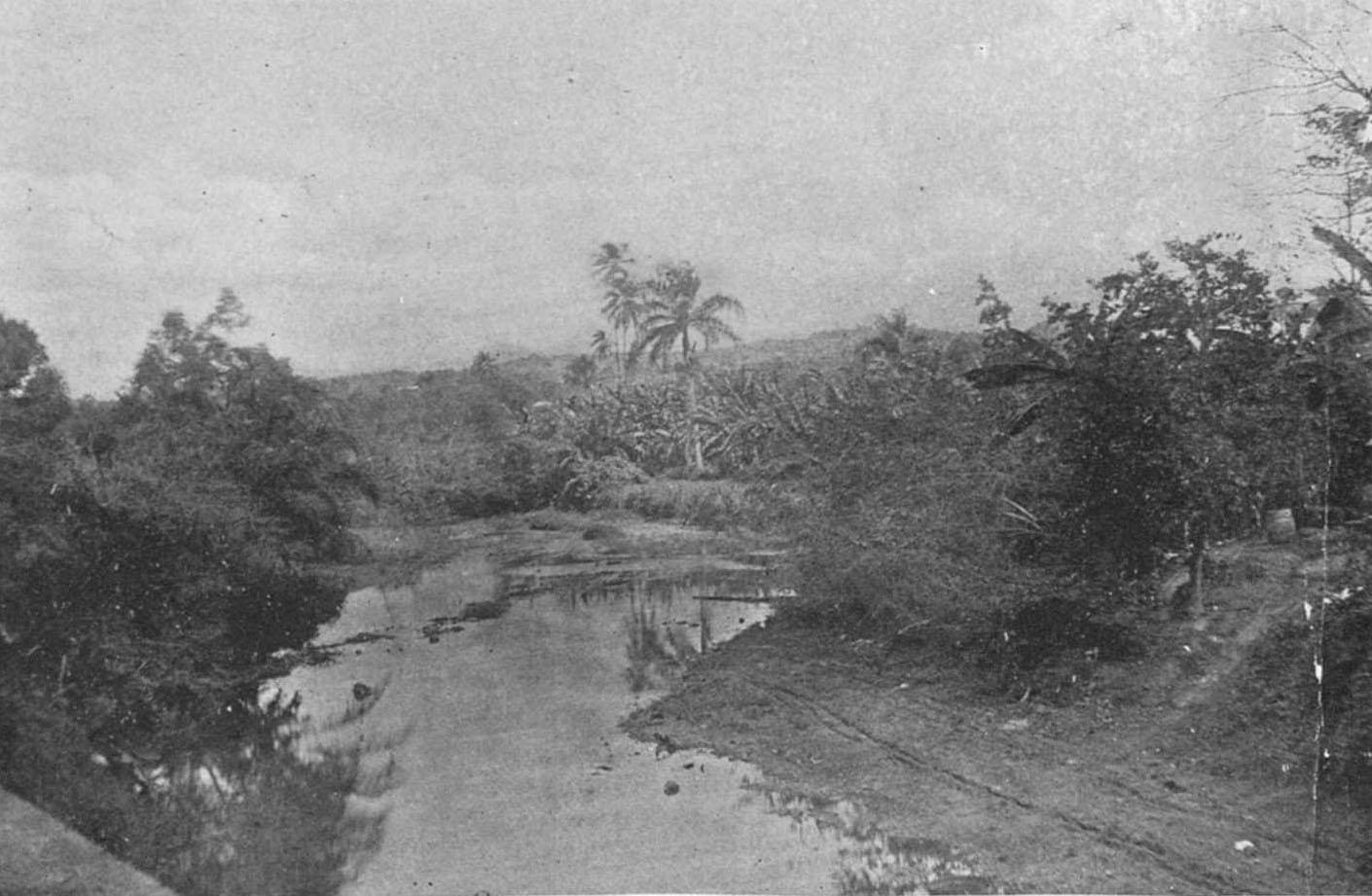
- Río Rosario in 1898

Location
- Commonwealth: Puerto Rico
- Municipality: Hormigueros

Physical characteristics
- Source
  - coordinates: 18.1294025°N 67.1332351°W
  - elevation: 23 ft.

The Río Rosario is a river of Maricao, Hormigueros, San Germán and Mayagüez in Puerto Rico.

Skirmishes were fought here during the Spanish-American War.

== See also ==
- Maricao Fish Hatchery: located along the river in Maricao, Puerto Rico
- Torréns Bridge: crosses the river in Hormigueros, Puerto Rico
- List of rivers of Puerto Rico
