= Logia Adelphia =

Historic building in Mayagüez, Puerto Rico

- U.S. National Register of Historic Places
- Puerto Rico Historic Sites and Zones
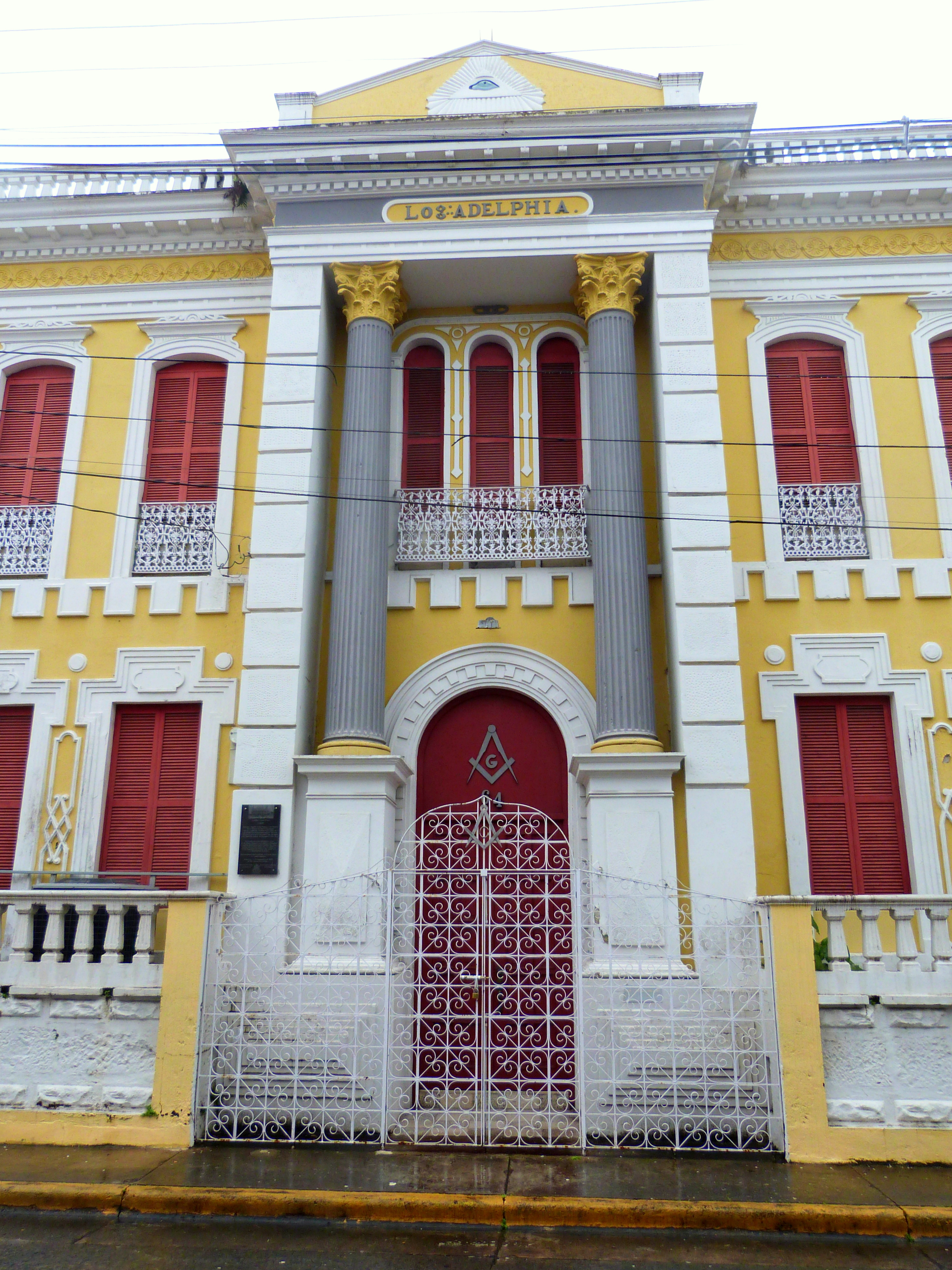
- The Logia Adelphia in 2017

- Location within Puerto Rico
- Location: 64E Sol Street; Mayagüez, Puerto Rico
- Coordinates: 18°12′01″N 67°08′20″W
- Area: 0.1 acres (0.040 ha)
- Built: 1912
- Architect: Sabas Honore
- Architectural style: Masonic temple
- NRHP reference No.: 86000323
- RNSZH No.: 2003-25-(1-9) JP-SH

Significant dates
- Added to NRHP: February 19, 1986
- Designated RNSZH: January 24, 2003

The Logia Adelphia is a historic building located in Mayagüez, Puerto Rico. It was built in 1912, and was designed by Sabas Honore, a prominent local architect. It was listed on the U.S. National Register of Historic Places, for its architecture, in 1986. The north facade, facing on the street, is elaborate and preserved. The interior has been renovated, and no longer reflects its original design.

In 1984, the building was still being used by Adelphia Lodge #1, the oldest Masonic Lodge located in Mayagüez.

== See also ==
- Logia Masónica Hijos de la Luz, in Yauco, Puerto Rico, also listed on the National Register
- List of Masonic buildings in the United States
- National Register of Historic Places listings in Mayagüez, Puerto Rico
