= Torréns Bridge =

Historic bridge in Hormigueros municipality, Puerto Rico

- Torréns Bridge (Note: The bridge's name is presented here without the accent on "Torréns" in conformance with the usage in the bridge's National Register nomination form and Weekly List announcement of listing.)
- U.S. National Register of Historic Places
- Location within Puerto Rico
- Location: Highway 319, km 1.5; Barrios Hormigueros and Benavente; Hormigueros, Puerto Rico
- Coordinates: 18°07′36″N 67°07′24″W
- Area: 100.58 m^{2} (1,082.6 sq ft)
- Built: 1878
- Built by: José Madera
- Architect: José de Echevarría
- Architectural style: Beam, lattice girder, transverse joist
- MPS: Spanish–American War in Puerto Rico MPS
- NRHP reference No.: 00000423
- Added to NRHP: May 11, 2000

The Torréns Bridge (Spanish: Puente Torréns) is a historic bridge over the Rosario River in Hormigueros municipality, Puerto Rico. It was built in 1878 in a beam bridge structure with lattice girders and transverse joists, a design unique in the later territory of the United States. It is named for Modesto Torréns Morales, mayor of Hormigueros from 1875 to 1879, during a period when the municipality advocated for improved transportation linkages from the settlement of Hormigueros to the rest of the island. Improvement of the difficult Rosario River crossing (Paso de las Nieves) on the road from the town to the main highway south of the river was seen as critical to economic development, especially after Hormigueros municipality separated from San Germán in 1874. In 1898 during the Spanish–American War, the Torréns Bridge was captured by the U.S. Army to aid its advance during the Battle of Hormigueros and subsequent march on Mayagüez.

The bridge was added to the U.S. National Register of Historic Places in 2000.

== See also ==
- Maricao Fish Hatchery: located along the Río Rosario in Maricao, Puerto Rico
- National Register of Historic Places listings in Hormigueros, Puerto Rico
