= Residencia Heygler =

Historic house in Mayagüez, Puerto Rico

- U.S. National Register of Historic Places
- Puerto Rico Historic Sites and Zones
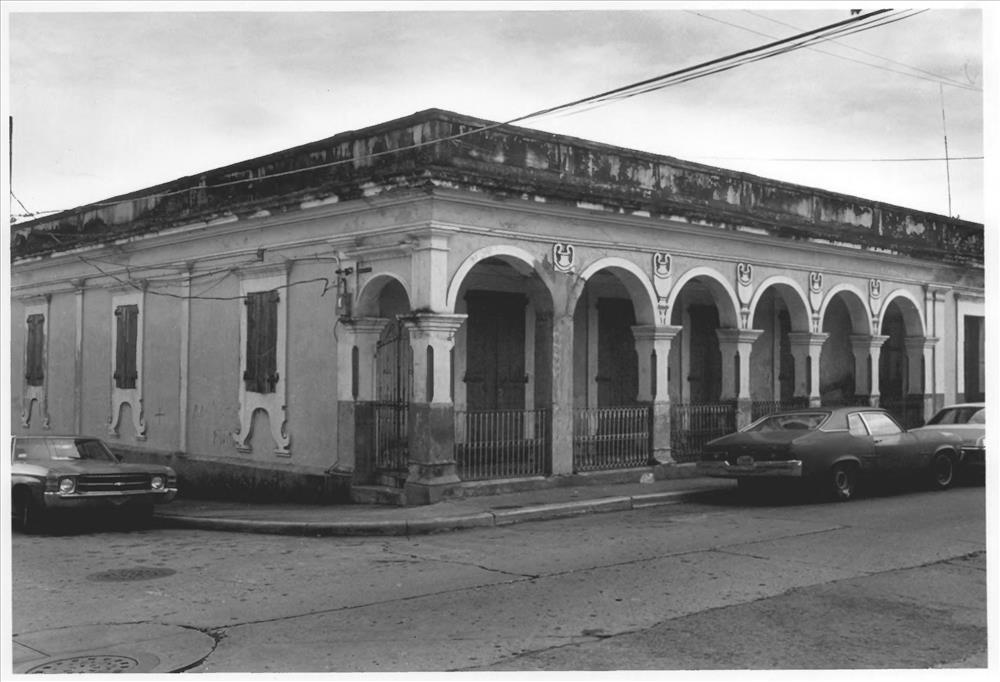
- The house in 1987.

- Location within Puerto Rico
- Location: 51 Liceo Street Mayagüez, Puerto Rico
- Coordinates: 18°12′01″N 67°08′07″W
- Built: 1830
- Architectural style: Neoclassical Spanish Colonial architecture
- NRHP reference No.: 88000962
- RNSZH No.: 2003-25-(1-9) JP-SH

Significant dates
- Added to NRHP: July 12, 1988
- Designated RNSZH: January 24, 2003

The Heygler Residence (Spanish: Residencia Heygler) is a historic 19th-century house located in Mayagüez Pueblo, the administrative and historic center of the municipality of Mayagüez, Puerto Rico. The house is notable for its arcade-balcony that is typical of 19th-century urban residences in western Puerto Rico and has been listed in the National Register of Historic Places since 1988. It was also added to the Puerto Rico Register of Historic Sites and Zones.

Although no official documentation about its construction exists, based on documentation by the current owners and on urban plans of the time it is estimated that the house was built in 1830 and that it survived the 1841 fire that engulfed much of the historic center of Mayagüez. It is possible that the house is even older than this date and that it is one of the oldest structures still standing in the city. The house is typical of sturdy wealthy residences of the time designed to withstand the tropical climate and natural disasters such as hurricanes and earthquakes, such as the 1899 hurricane and the 1918 earthquake. This type of design would be further developed throughout the 19th and early 20th centuries in the island. The exterior is completely preserved but the interiors have been somewhat modified throughout the history of the building.

== See also ==
- National Register of Historic Places listings in western Puerto Rico
