= Oliver Hazard Perry Graded School =

- U.S. National Register of Historic Places
- Location within Puerto Rico
- Location: Junction of San Blas and Concordia Streets, Lajas, Puerto Rico
- Coordinates: 18°3′1″N 67°3′35″W
- Built: 1904-1907
- Architect: Adriano González, Jorge Frank, Charles G. Post
- Architectural style: Classical Revival
- NRHP reference No.: 16000852
- Added to NRHP: December 13, 2016

Oliver Hazard Perry Graded School (Spanish: Escuela Oliver Hazard Perry), often referred to as the Perry School (Escuela Perry) or just La Perry, is an early 20th century school located in Lajas, Puerto Rico. The school building was added to the United States National Register of Historic Places in 2016.

The property, with a footprint of 353.03 square meters, sits at the northern end of an 841.66 square meter urban lot facing the southwest corner of the town square in downtown Lajas (Lajas Pueblo). The Oliver Hazard Perry Graded School is the earliest extant school building built by the Department of Education of Puerto Rico in the Municipality of Lajas. The school has some aspects of integrity as location, setting, workmanship and association.

== See also ==
- Luis Muñoz Rivera School: also located in Lajas, Puerto Rico
- National Register of Historic Places listings in western Puerto Rico
