= Luis Muñoz Rivera School =

- U.S. National Register of Historic Places
- Location within Puerto Rico
- Location: Junction of 65 de Infantería and M. Dávila Streets, Lajas, Puerto Rico
- Coordinates: 18°2′52″N 67°3′33″W
- Built: 1926
- Architect: Fidel Sevillano Espinosa
- Architectural style: Beaux Arts Mission/Spanish Revival
- NRHP reference No.: 12001076
- Added to NRHP: December 19, 2012

Luis Muñoz Rivera School (Spanish: Escuela Luis Muñoz Rivera) is a historic 1926 public school located in Lajas, Puerto Rico. It was added to the United States National Register of Historic Places in 2012.

== History ==
The school, located at 65 de Infantería Street, corner with Dávila Street, in the downtown area of the municipality of Lajas. Many original features remain in place, making the Luis Muñoz Rivera School is one of Puerto Rico's best examples of government-sponsored institutional architecture during the early 20th century.

The Luis Muñoz Rivera School was designed by architect Fidel Sevillano Espinosa in a Beaux Arts and Spanish/Mission Revival styles. It is a one-story high, reinforced concrete building. Erected four blocks away from the town's plaza in a rectangular lot measuring 18,425 square metres (198,330 sq ft), the school originally included 8 classrooms.

== See also ==
- Oliver Hazard Perry Graded School: also in Lajas, Puerto Rico
- National Register of Historic Places listings in western Puerto Rico
