= La Casa Solariega de Jose De Diego =

Historic house in Mayagüez, Puerto Rico

- La Casa Solariega de Jose de Diego
- U.S. National Register of Historic Places
- Puerto Rico Historic Sites and Zones
- Location within Puerto Rico
- Location: 52 Liceo St., Mayagüez, Puerto Rico
- Coordinates: 18°12′07″N 67°08′10″W
- Area: 0.017 acres (0.0069 ha)
- Built: 1897
- Architect: José Sabas Honoré
- NRHP reference No.: 86000624
- RNSZH No.: 2003-25-(1-9) JP-SH

Significant dates
- Added to NRHP: April 3, 1986
- Designated RNSZH: January 24, 2003

The Casa Solariega de José de Diego, also known as the Lería Esmoris Residence, is a historic home built in 1897. It was listed on the National Register of Historic Places in 1986 and on the Puerto Rico Register of Historic Sites and Zones in 2003.

== History ==
The house was designed by José Sabas Honoré Rivera and built by his father, Victor Honoré Garaud. The daughter of the former, Laura Honoré de Cuebas, was the author of the hymn of the University of Puerto Rico, Mayagüez Campus, which would be founded in 1911 by de Diego and she would give birth to a daughter of the same name, who would go on to teach there, in a hospital that would become the university's art museum. It was originally built for Santiago Sáenz y Martínez, who later passed it to José de Diego. de Diego resided there for some years, as he was designated prosecutor and president of the Audiencia (Criminal Court) of Mayagüez in 1899 by General Brooke and three years later was elected as the representative for the House of Delegates. Later, de Diego's only sister, Pola de Diez, lived in the residence with her husband Alejandro Lull. In 1923 it was bought by Fructuoso Lería Domínguez, later passed to his son, Dr. José Pedro Lería Esmoris, who was the then-owner when it was listed in the NRHP, and finally to his daughter Griselda Lería Santana.

== Description ==
The property is an urban mansion built in the "Modernist" located on a 716.82 m^{2} plot in the middle of a block, permitting the mansion to have a front entrance, to Liceo St., and a back entrance, facing Salud St. It is an L-shaped mansion.

== Future Plans ==
On 2 April 2012, the Municipality of Mayagüez expropriated the property from Natalabriel, Inc., a tire business which owns the whole block, with the intention to establish a museum in the building commemorating the University of Puerto Rico at Mayagüez, since de Diego was a cofounder of the institution.

== Timeline ==
| Date | Event |
|---|---|
| 1897 | The house is built. |
| Subsequently, | Passes to José de Diego. |
| Subsequently, | de Diego's sister resides with her husband. |
| 1923 | Fructuoso Lería Domínguez acquires the property. |
| 2013 | The Municipality of Mayagüez acquires it to establish a museum of the University of Puerto Rico, since José de Diego was one of the cofounders. |
