= Sabana Grande Masonic Cemetery =

Historic cemetery in Puerto Rico

- Cementerio Masónico de la Resp. Logia Igualdad Núm. 23 de Sabana Grande
- U.S. National Register of Historic Places
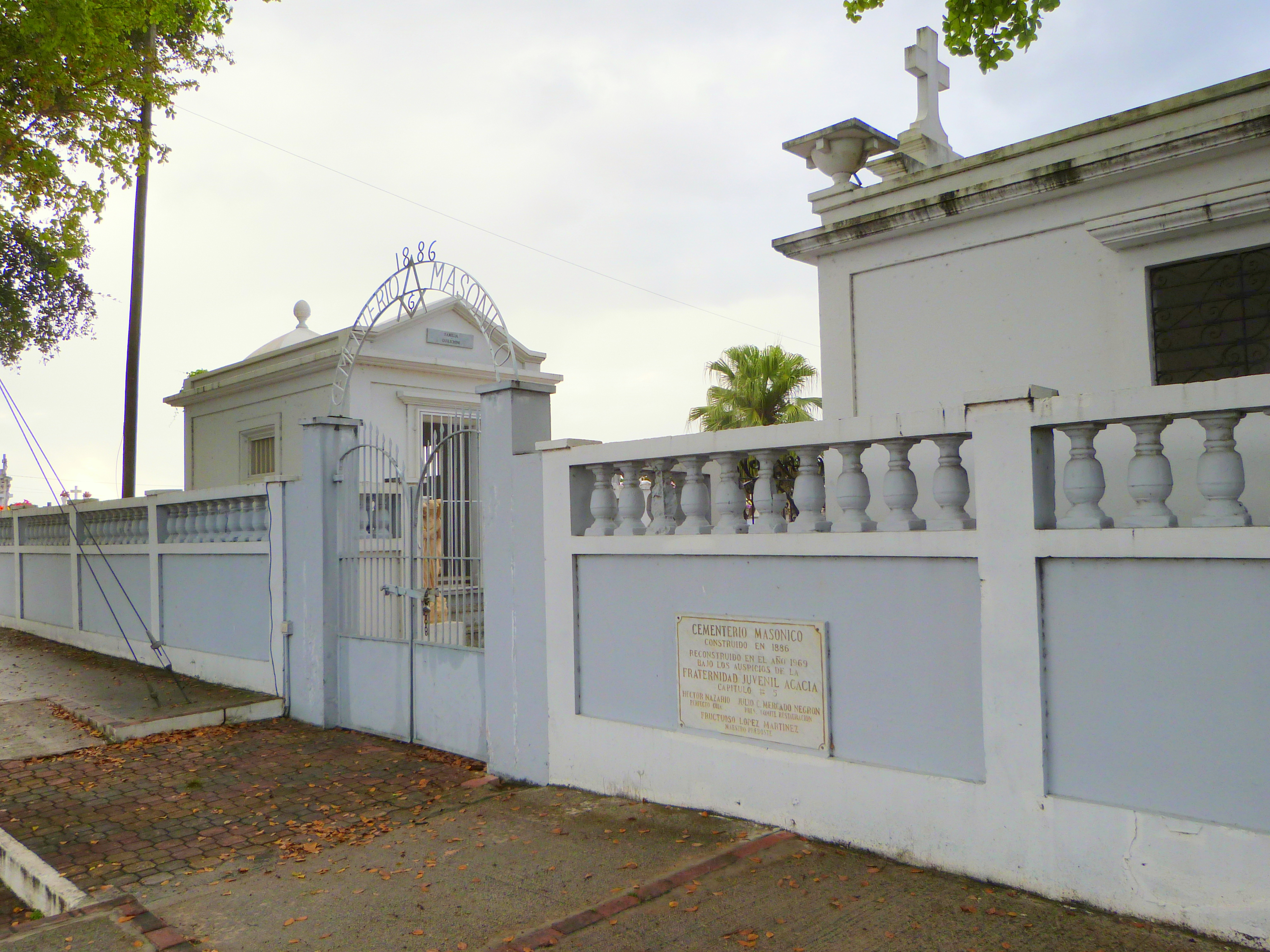
- Front gate of Sabana Grande Masonic Cemetery

- Location within Puerto Rico
- Location: Junction of Highway 121 and Street 1 Santana barrio Sabana Grande municipality Puerto Rico
- Coordinates: 18°04′45″N 66°58′02″W
- Area: 1,056 square metres (11,370 sq ft)
- Built: 1886 (first interment); 1890 (officially established); 1897–1898 (walls built)
- MPS: Cemeteries in Puerto Rico, 1804–1920, MPS
- NRHP reference No.: 13000014
- Added to NRHP: February 13, 2013

The Sabana Grande Masonic Cemetery (Spanish: Cementerio Masónico de Sabana Grande), known formally as Cementerio Masónico de la Resp. Logia Igualdad Núm. 23 de Sabana Grande (English: Masonic Cemetery of the Respectable Equality Lodge Number 23 of Sabana Grande), is a historic cemetery in Sabana Grande, Puerto Rico.

The Masonic cemetery was listed on the U.S. National Register of Historic Places in 2013.

== See also ==
- National Register of Historic Places listings in Sabana Grande, Puerto Rico
