= Nazario Rivera Residence =

- Residencia Nazario Rivera
- U.S. National Register of Historic Places
- Puerto Rico Historic Sites and Zones
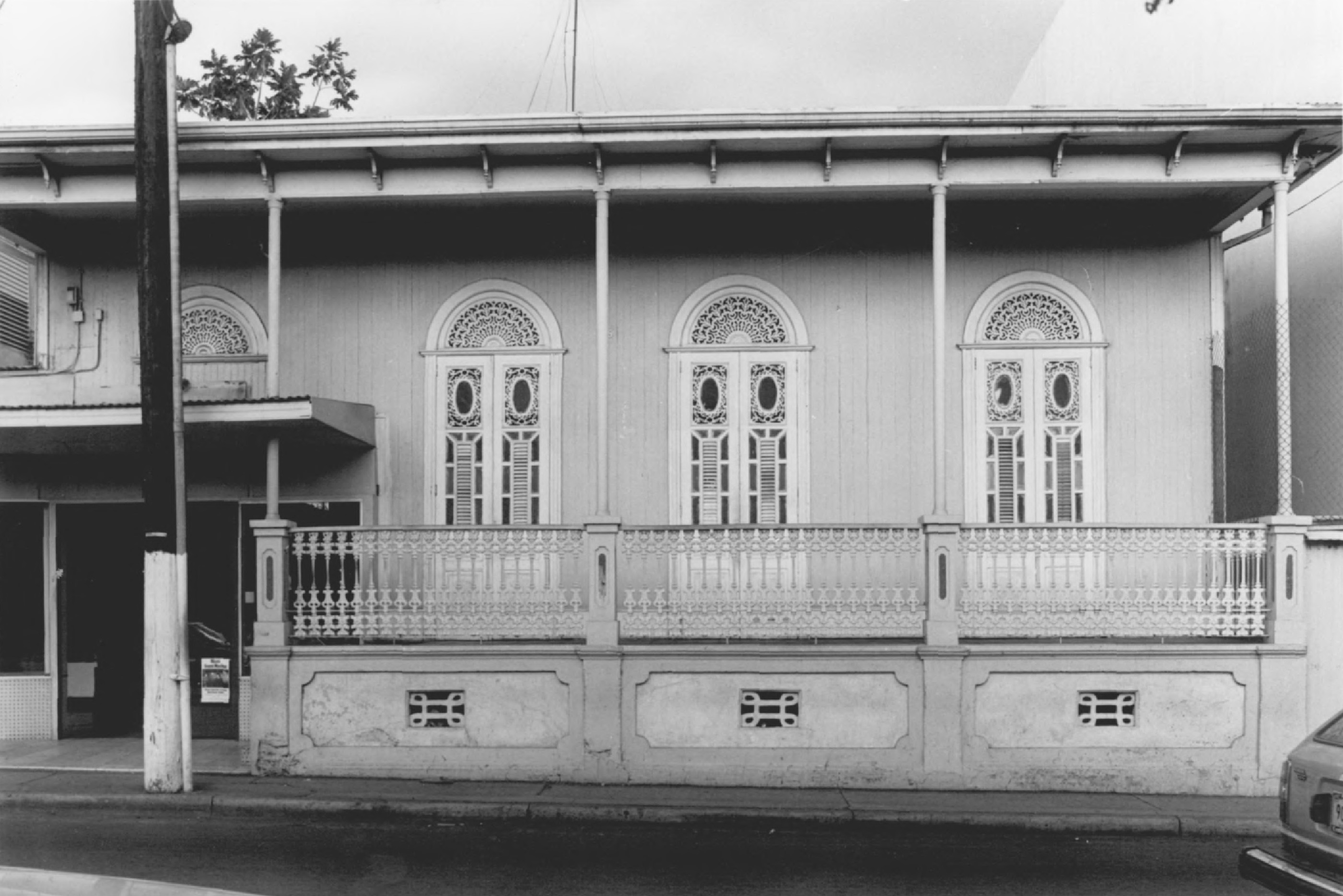
- Residencia Nazario Rivera in 1987.

- Location within Puerto Rico
- Location: 105 Post Street Mayagüez, Puerto Rico
- Coordinates: 18°11′55″N 67°08′29″W
- Built: 1872
- Architect: Joaquín Hernández, Mr. Bayron
- Architectural style: Criollo vernacular
- NRHP reference No.: 88000686
- RNSZH No.: 2000-(RO)-19-JP-SH

Significant dates
- Added to NRHP: September 13, 1988
- Designated RNSZH: December 21, 2000

The Nazario Rivera Residence (Spanish: Residencia Nazario Rivera) is a late 19th-century historic house located in Mayagüez Pueblo, the administrative and historic center of the municipality of Mayagüez, Puerto Rico. The house is a traditional L-shaped residential structure of 19th-century Puerto Rico with spacious interiors that are traditional of Mayagüez, where dining and living rooms have very high ceilings. The house was built in 1872 by Joaquín Hernández, following designs signed by a Mr. Bayron.

== Gallery ==
House details

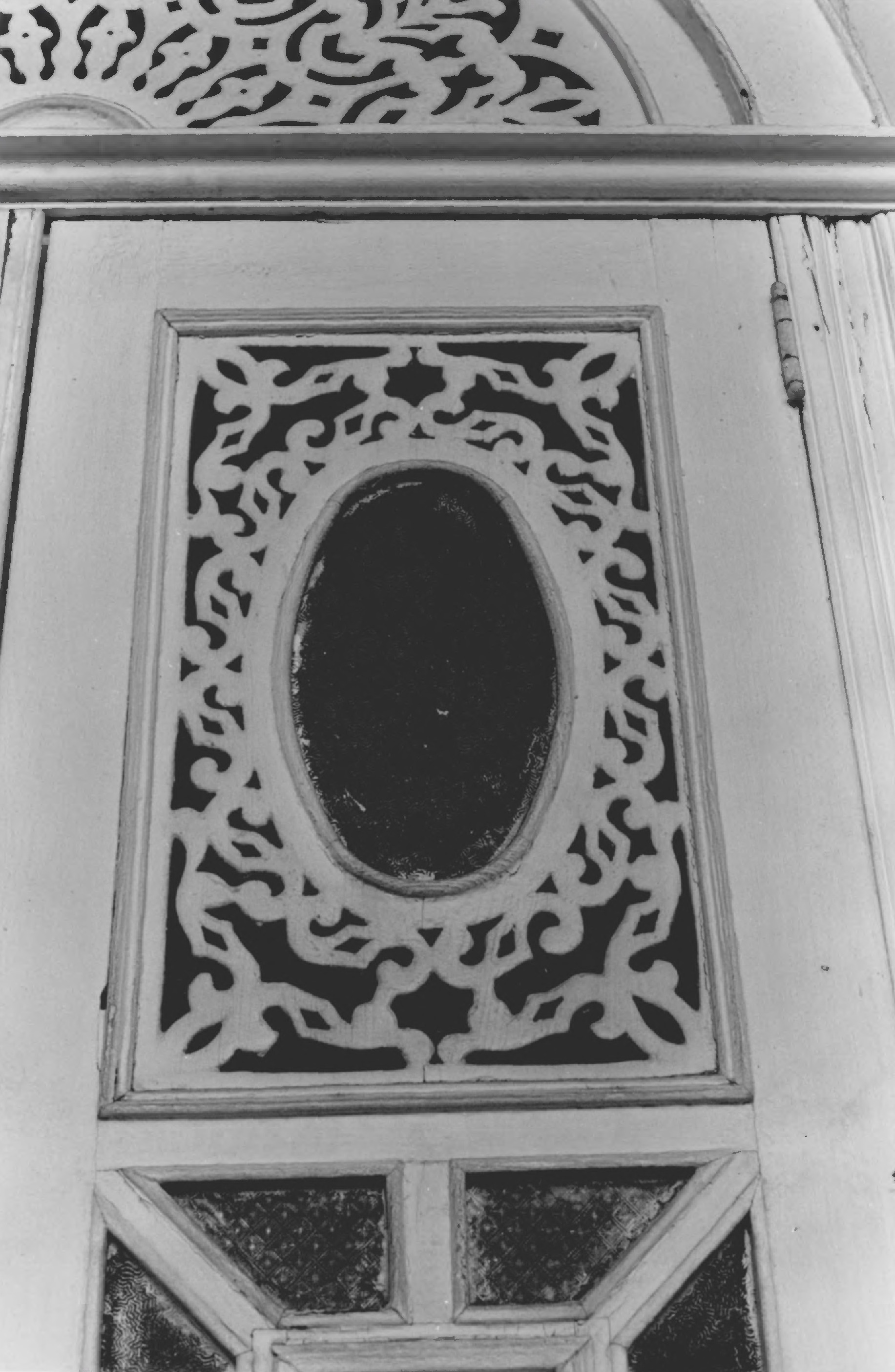

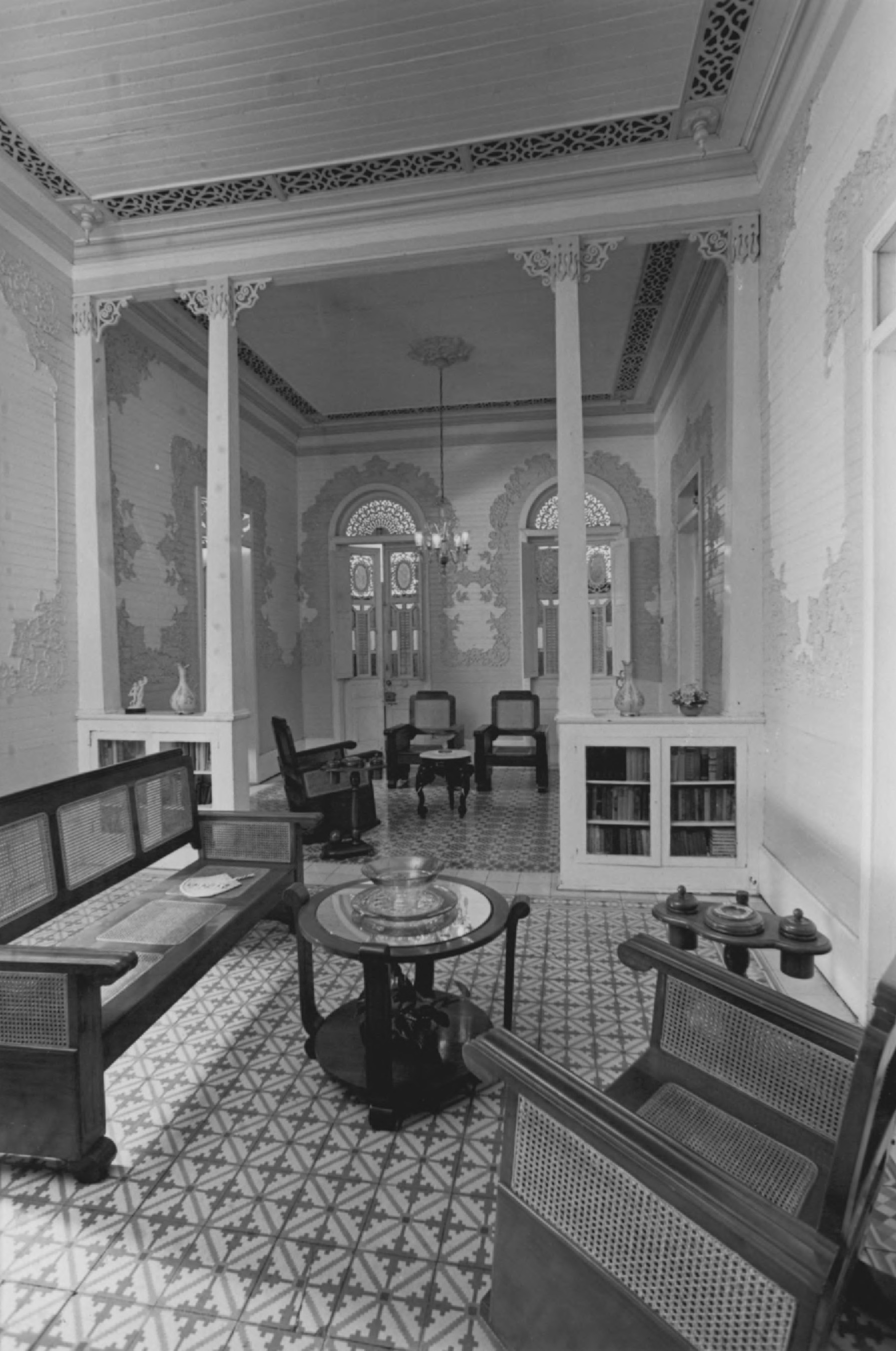

== See also ==
- National Register of Historic Places listings in western Puerto Rico
