= Fuerte de la Concepción =

Historic Spanish fortress in Aguadilla, Puerto Rico

- Fuerte de la Concepción (Note: Sources authoritative with regard to National Register listing parameters give different forms of the fort's name, including Fuerte de la Concepción from the fort's nomination form, Fuerte de la Concepcion from the official weekly announcement of National Register actions, and Fuerte de la Conception from the comprehensive National Register database. This article adopts the first of these, Fuerte de la Concepción, because it offers the most proper Spanish orthography.)
- U.S. National Register of Historic Places
- Puerto Rico Historic Sites and Zones
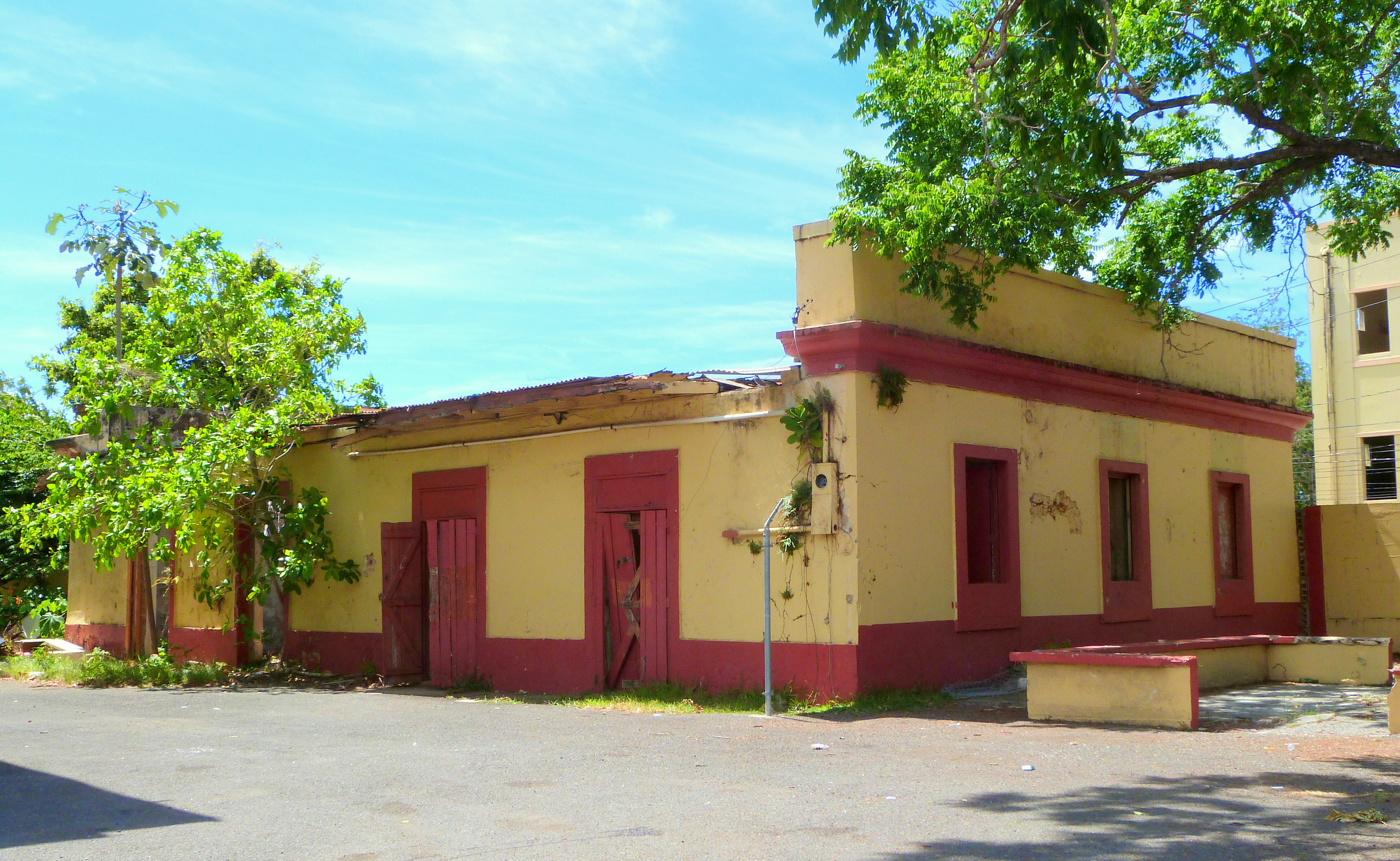
- The surviving structure of the fort in 2017

- Location within Puerto Rico
- Location: Calle Agustín Stahl; Aguadilla, Puerto Rico
- Coordinates: 18°26′09″N 67°09′21″W
- Built: 1880
- Architect: Spanish Royal Engineers Corps
- NRHP reference No.: 86000703
- RNSZH No.: 2000-(RO)-19-JP-SH

Significant dates
- Added to NRHP: April 3, 1986
- Designated RNSZH: December 21, 2000

The Fuerte de la Concepción (English: Fort of the Conception) was a Spanish military fortress guarding the port and town of Aguadilla, Puerto Rico, in the 18th and 19th centuries. In 1986, the fort's single surviving building was listed on the U.S. National Register of Historic Places, and later on the Puerto Rico Register of Historic Sites and Zones in 2000.

== See also ==
- National Register of Historic Places listings in Aguadilla, Puerto Rico
- Fuerte de San José
