= Duran Esmoris Residencia =

Historic place in Mayagüez, Puerto Rico

- U.S. National Register of Historic Places
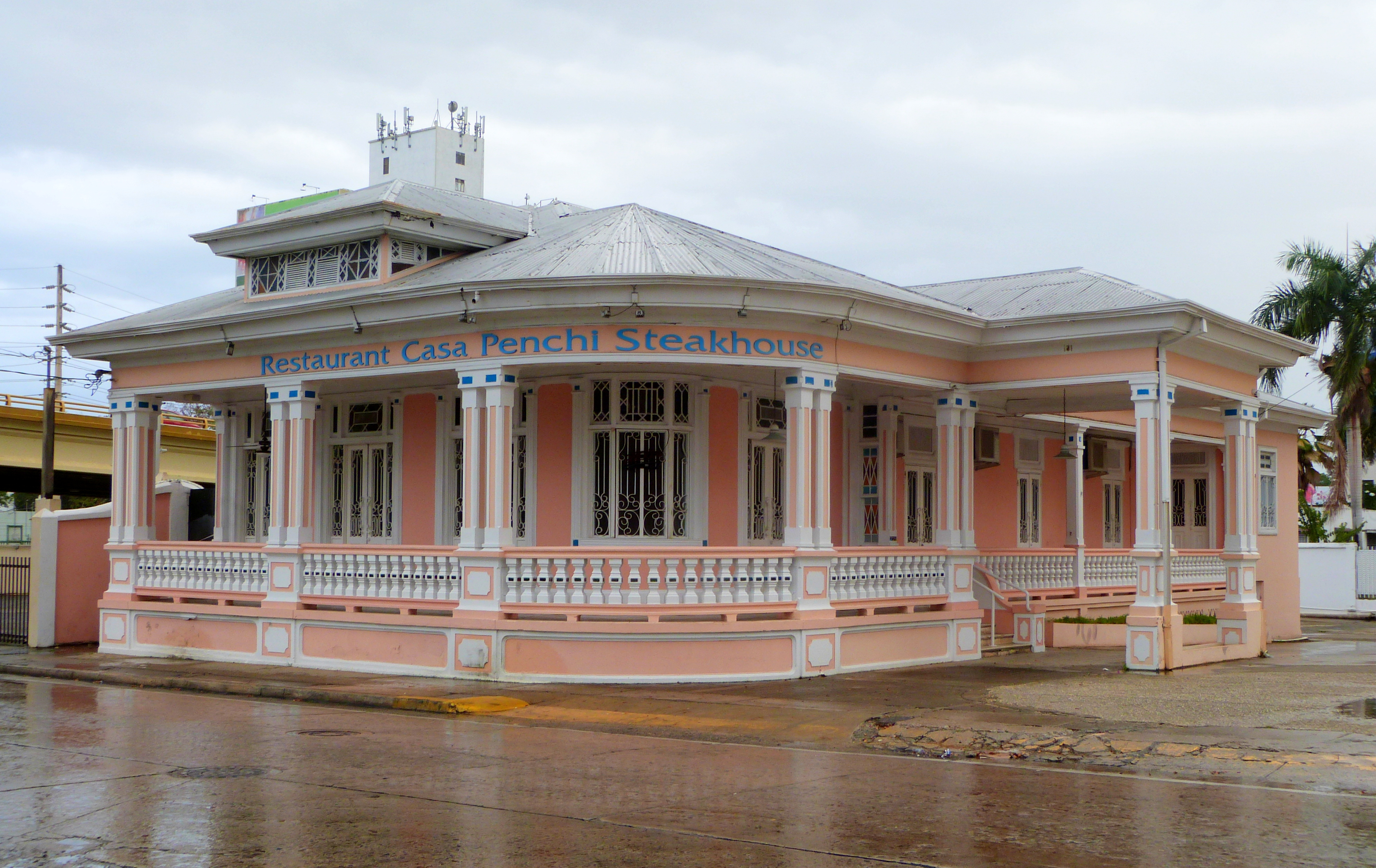
- Duran Esmoris Residence in 2017
- Location: Mendez Vigo B204 L204, Mayagüez, Puerto Rico
- Coordinates: 18.20455°N 67.14569°W
- Area: less than one acre
- Built: 1921
- Architect: Luis Fernando Nieva
- Architectural style: Art Nouveau
- NRHP reference No.: 88000655
- Added to NRHP: September 7, 1988

Duran Esmoris Residencia is a building in Mayagüez, Puerto Rico, situated on less than an acre of land on Mendez Vigo Street. Its foundation is concrete, its roof metal and zinc. Designed by architect Luis Fernando Nieva, the building is generally rectangular in shape. Built in 1921, the people who lived in the residence were prominent members of the municipality of Mayagüez. Columns with ornate carvings separate the main rooms. The ground level is 3 feet off the ground, the veranda circles around the building.

The Duran Esmoris residence features tall ceilings, mosaic and stained class making it one of the last remaining structures with good representation of what the character of Mendez Vigo Street was in the early 20th century.
