= James Garfield Graded School =

Puerto Rican historic place

- U.S. National Register of Historic Places
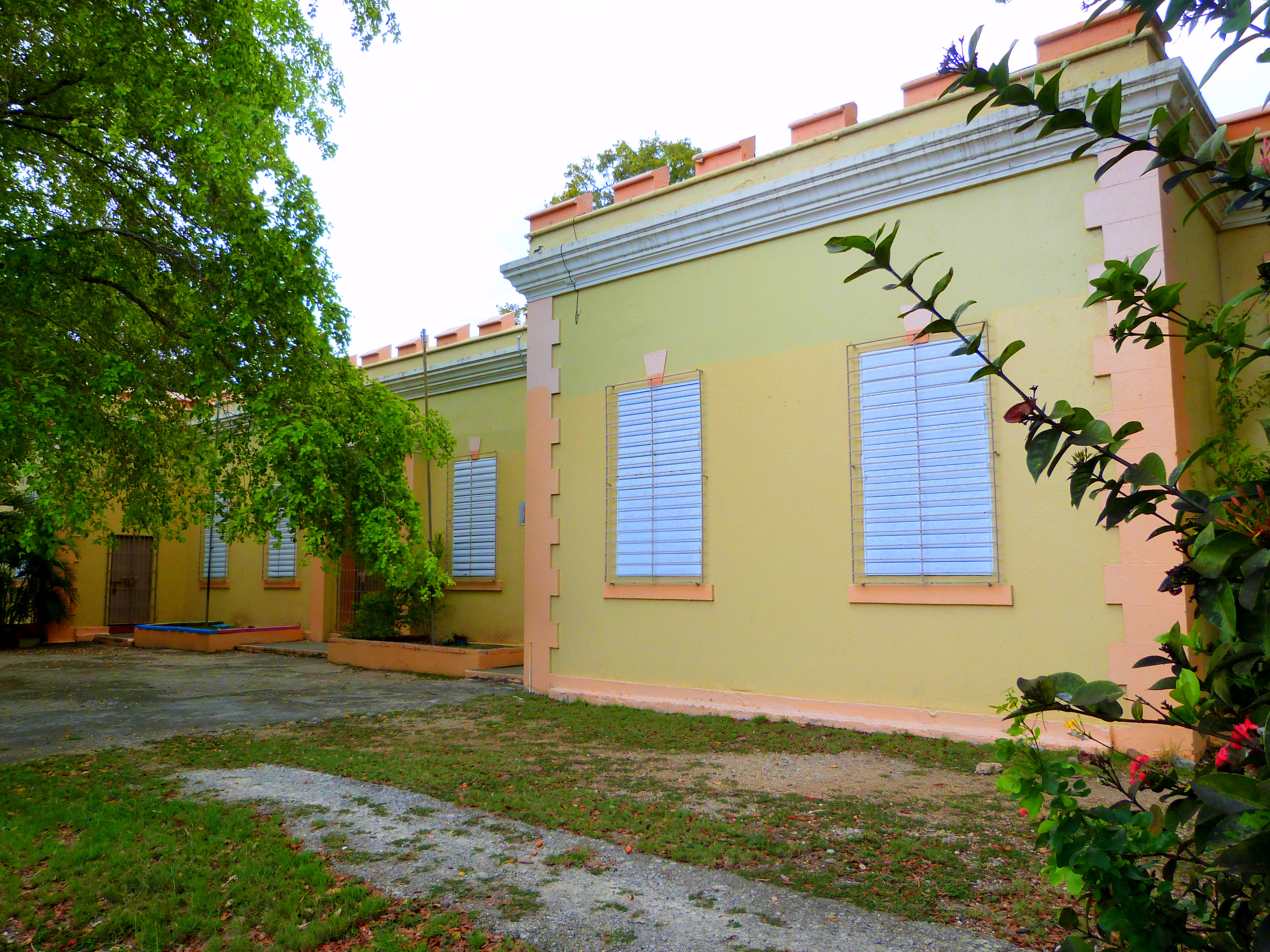
- The school in 2018.

- Location within Puerto Rico
- Location: 65 de Infantería Street Guánica, Puerto Rico
- Coordinates: 17°58′23″N 66°54′31″W
- Built: 1903
- Architect: Charles G. Post
- Architectural style: Late 19th and Early 20th Century American Neoclassical
- NRHP reference No.: 15000275
- Added to NRHP: May 26, 2015

The James A. Garfield Graded School (Spanish: Escuela James Garfield) is a public elementary school named after the 20th president of the United States, James A. Garfield, located in Guánica, Puerto Rico. The school was added to the United States National Register of Historic Places in 2015.

The school is a one-story, seven-classrooms, L-shaped, brick, masonry and concrete Neoclassical, flat-with-parapet-metal-roofed building. The property sits in a 2,880 square meters urban lot, located northwest across the street from the town square and north from the main Catholic church in the historical and administrative center of the municipality of Guánica. This is the oldest school in the municipality and one of the oldest school buildings in Puerto Rico.

== Gallery ==
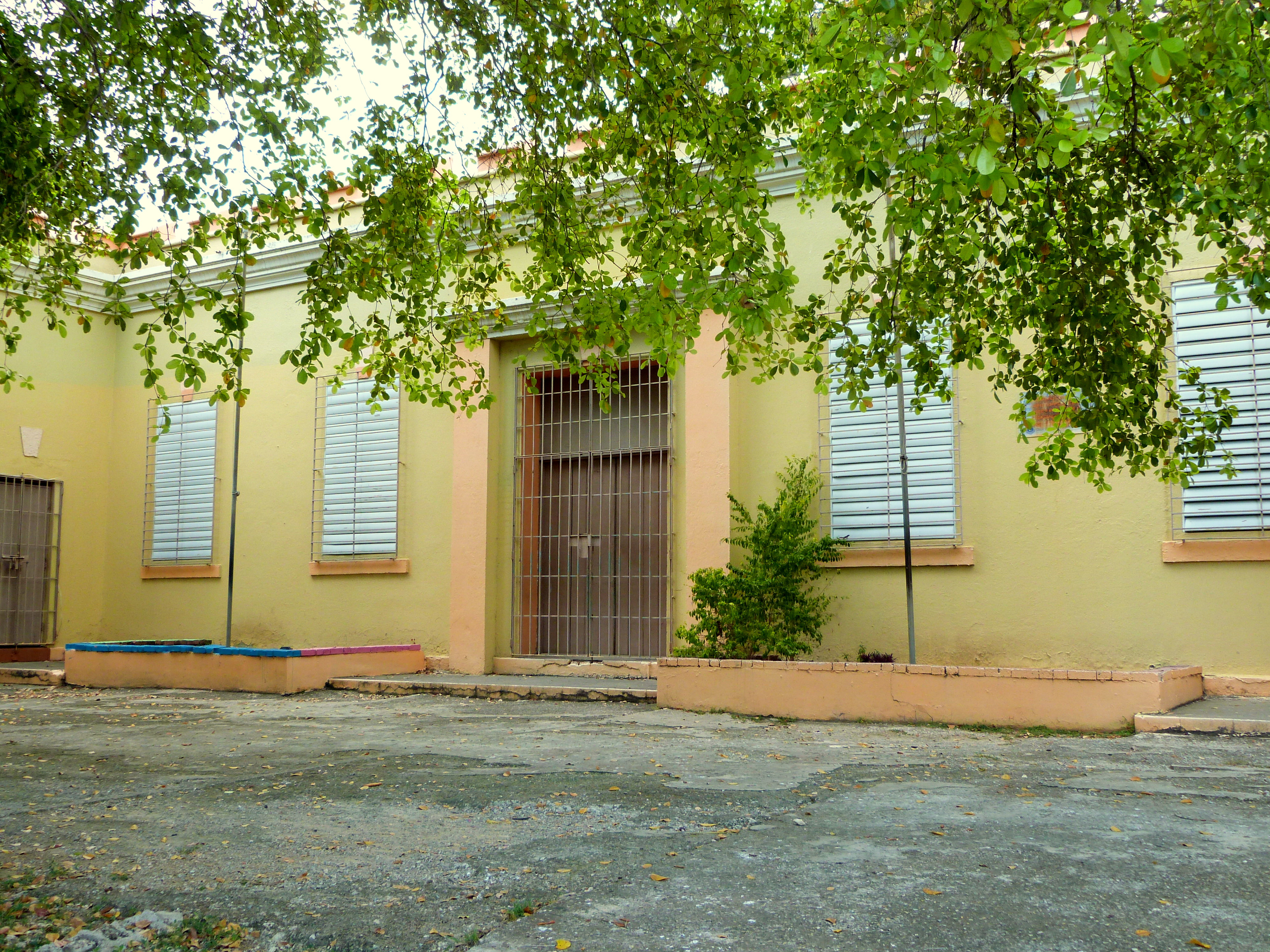
Former main entrance, 2018.
