= Lassise–Schettini House =

Historic house in Sabana Grande, Puerto Rico

- U.S. National Register of Historic Places
- Puerto Rico Historic Sites and Zones
- Location within Puerto Rico
- Location: End of Ángel G. Martínez Street; Sabana Grande, Puerto Rico
- Coordinates: 18°05′02″N 66°57′33″W
- Built: 1924
- Architect: Perocier, Luis
- Architectural style: Prairie School, Moorish-Spanish Revival
- NRHP reference No.: 87001823
- RNSZH No.: 2000-(RO)-19-JP-SH

Significant dates
- Added to NRHP: October 21, 1987
- Designated RNSZH: December 21, 2000

The Lassise–Schettini House, also known as La Quinta, is a historic house in Sabana Grande, Puerto Rico. It was designed by architect Luis Perocier and built in 1924 for Dr. Enrique Lassise, a physician and "remembered good-samaritan" of the town of Sabana Grande and his wife Matilde Schettini, a schoolteacher.

It was listed on the National Register of Historic Places in 1987 and on the Puerto Rico Register of Historic Sites and Zones in 2000.

It is a two-story building with a mix of architectural styles, showing influence of the style of the traditional plantation house of the United States Gulf Coast and the Caribbean, of the Chicago Prairie style, and of the Moorish-Spanish Revival.

Perocier learned from more renowned Czech architect Antonin Nechodoma, who himself settled in Puerto Rico eventually after studying with Frank Lloyd Wright under Louis Sullivan. While most of Nechodoma's works in Puerto Rico are gone; La Quinta survives as "one of the few major examples of prairie-influenced structures in Puerto Rico and the only intact manor house of its kind in Sabana Grande."
