= Iglesia San Isidro Labrador y Santa María de la Cabeza =

Historic church in Sabana Grande, Puerto Rico

San Isidro Labrador Church
- Parish Church of San Isidro Labrador y Santa María de la Cabeza
- Iglesia San Isidro Labrador y Santa María de la Cabeza
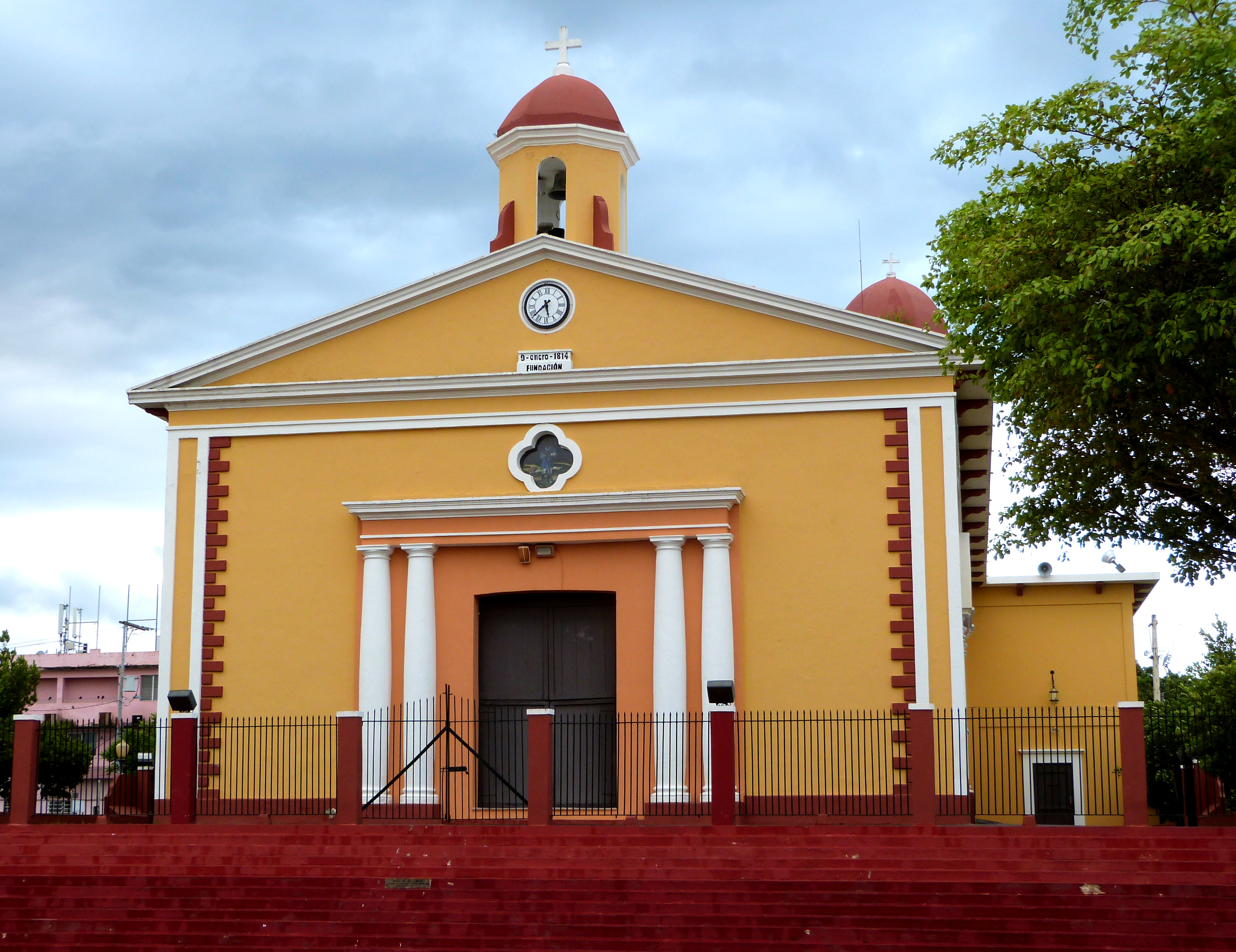
- View of the church in 2017

- Location in Puerto Rico
- 18°04′46″N 66°57′34″W
- Location: Sabana Grande Pueblo, Sabana Grande, Puerto Rico
- Address: Ángel G. Martínez Street, Town Plaza; Sabana Grande, Puerto Rico
- Country: Puerto Rico
- Denomination: Roman Catholic Church
- Website: diocesisdemayaguez.org/parroquia-san-isidro-labrador

History
- Status: Parish church
- Founded: January 9, 1814
- Founder: Juan Alejo de Arizmendi
- Dedication: Isidore the Laborer and Maria Torribia
- Consecrated: 1852

Architecture
- Heritage designation: NRHP
- Designated: 1984
- Architectural type: Spanish Colonial
- Groundbreaking: 1808
- Completed: 1844

Administration
- Diocese: Mayagüez
- Church of San Isidro Labrador and Santa María de la Cabeza of Sabana Grande
- U.S. National Register of Historic Places
- Built: 1844
- MPS: Historic Churches of Puerto Rico MPS
- NRHP reference No.: 84000460
- Added to NRHP: December 10, 1984

The Iglesia San Isidro Labrador y Santa María de la Cabeza (English: Church of Saint Isidore the Laborer and Blessed Maria Torribia) is a 19th-century Spanish Colonial-style church building located in the main town square of Sabana Grande, Puerto Rico.

It is one of 31 Puerto Rican churches reviewed for listing on the National Register of Historic Places in 1984 as part of the Historic Churches of Puerto Rico multiple property submission (MPS). It was also added to the Puerto Rico Register of Historic Sites and Zones on December 21, 2000.

== History ==
A rural chapel belonging to the regional parish of San Germán already existed at the site of the current church by the time of the founding of Sabana Grande in 1775. As decreed by the Law of the Indies, the parish church was established between 1808 (the year when the church began construction) and 1814 at the site of the main town square across from the city hall of Sabana Grande. The purpose of this new church building was to accommodate the growing population of the town powered by improvements in farming practice in the area during the early 19th-century The parish was dedicated jointly to the saints Isidore the Laborer and Maria Torribia, a husband and wife pair who are the patron saints of farmers.

The church received numerous additions and modifications throughout the 19th century and the beginning of the 20th century. For example, a clock which is now the second oldest still in continuous use in Puerto Rico was added to its facade in 1864. The Bishop of Ponce saw reconstruction in 1934.

== Gallery ==
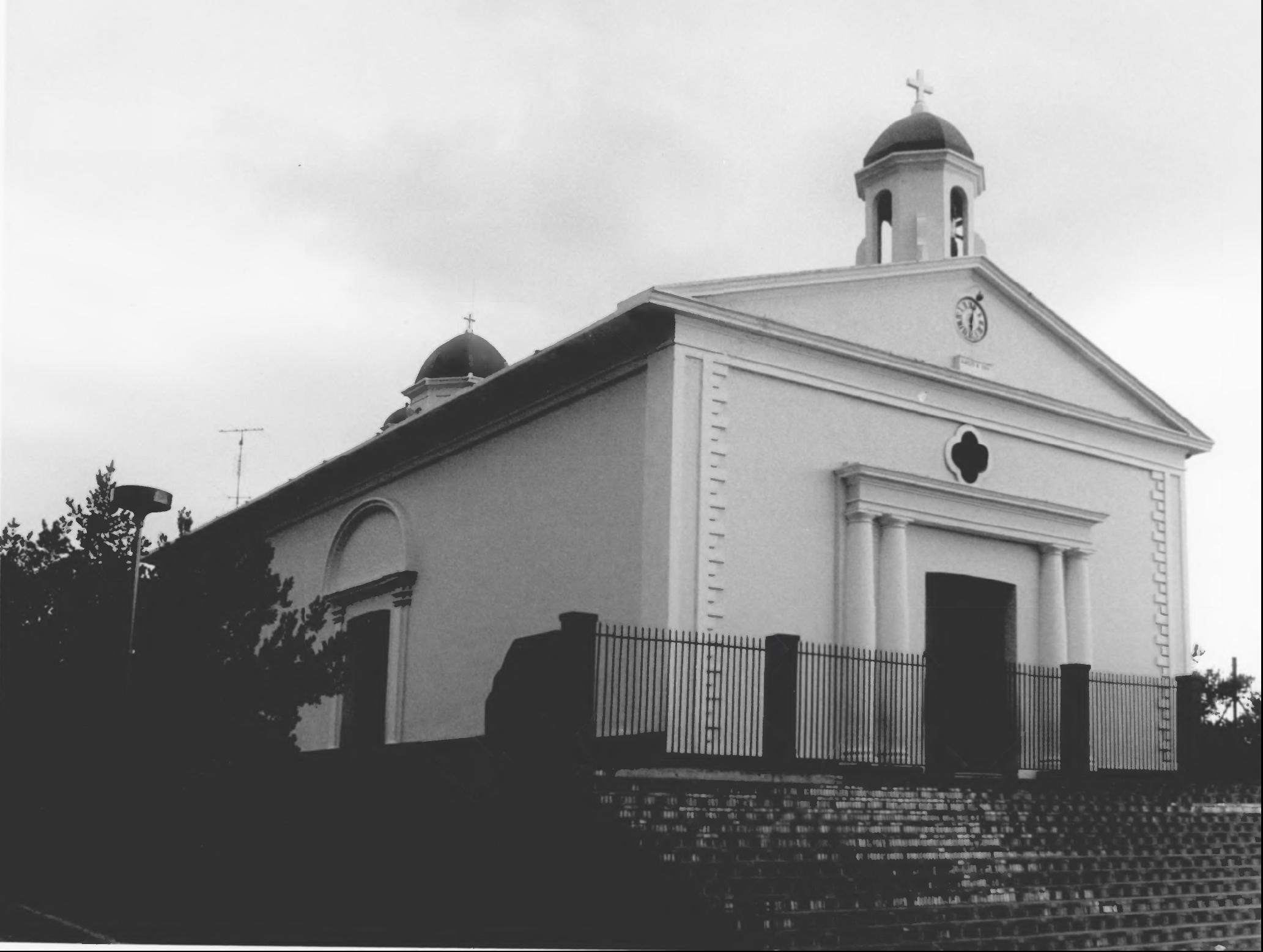
View of the church in 1984

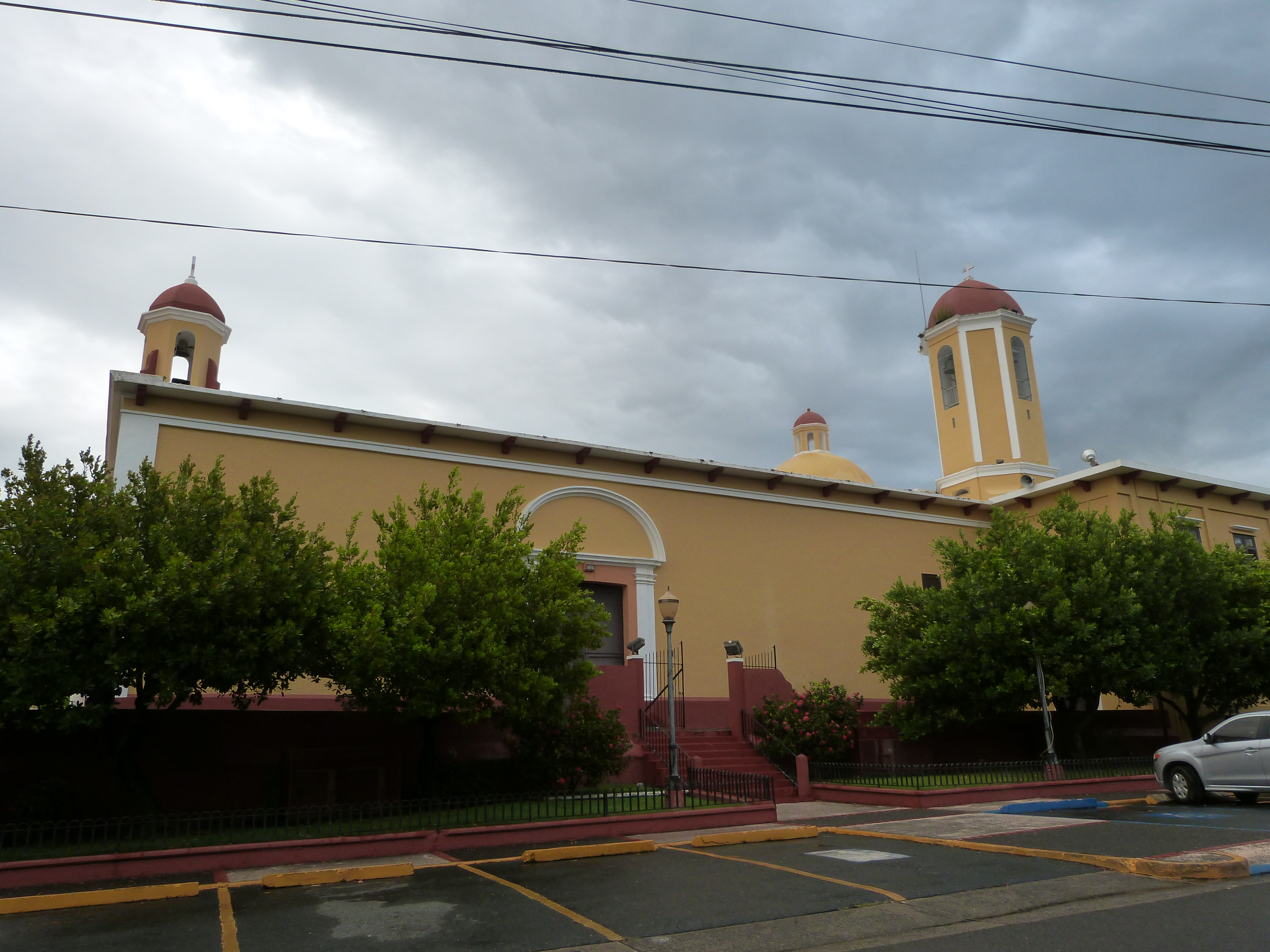
View from the south in 2017

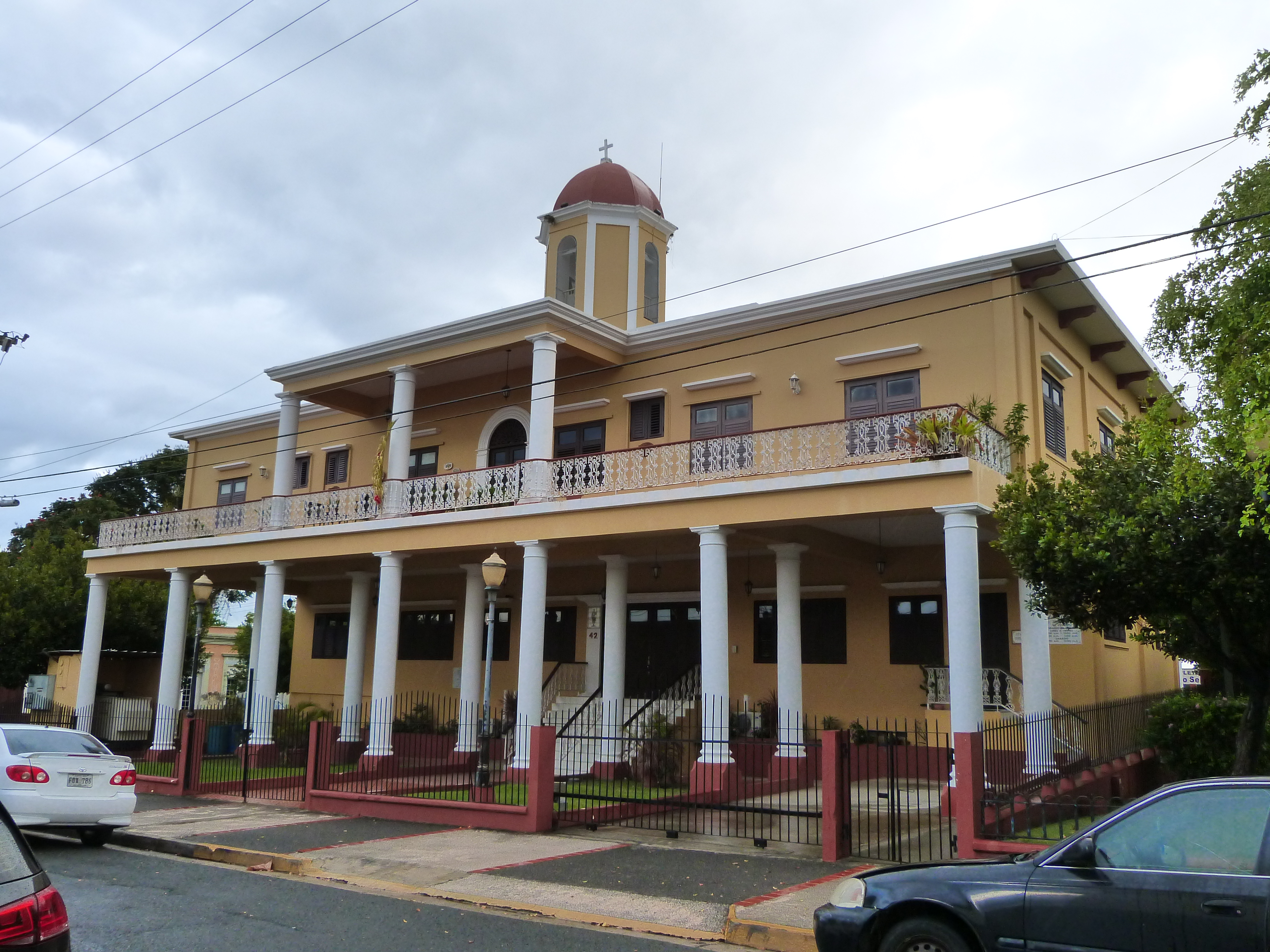
Parish house in 2017

== See also ==
- National Register of Historic Places in Sabana Grande, Puerto Rico
