= Sabàs Honoré =

Puerto Rican architect

Sabàs Honoré was an architect in Puerto Rico.

He was "one of the most brilliant architects of the era".

He designed at least two buildings that are listed on the U.S. National Register of Historic Places:

- Teatro Yagüez, a theatre at La Candelaria and Dr. Basora Streets in Mayagüez, Puerto Rico, rebuilt in 1919,
- Logia Adelphia, a clubhouse built in 1912, at 64 E. Sol St. in Mayagüez.
