= District Courthouse (Aguadilla, Puerto Rico) =

Historic building in Aguadilla, Puerto Rico

- U.S. National Register of Historic Places
- Puerto Rico Historic Sites and Zones
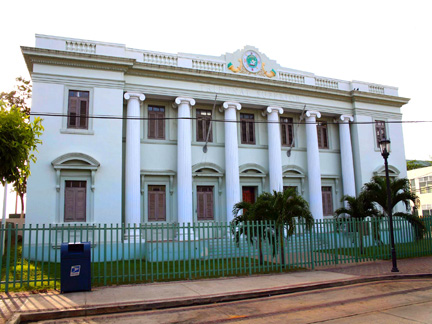

- Location within Puerto Rico
- Location: Calle Progreso; Aguadilla, Puerto Rico
- Coordinates: 18°25′32″N 67°09′16″W
- Built: 1925
- Architect: Rafael Carmoega
- NRHP reference No.: 85000041
- RNSZH No.: 2000-(RO)-19-JP-SH

Significant dates
- Added to NRHP: January 2, 1985
- Designated RNSZH: December 21, 2000

District Courthouse, also known as Museo de Arte de Aguadilla, in Aguadilla, Puerto Rico, was built in 1925. It was listed on the National Register of Historic Places in 1985, and to the Puerto Rico Register of Historic Sites and Zones in 2000.

It was designed by architect Rafael Carmoega. The second story now serves as a museum of art.
