= Aguadilla barrio-pueblo =

Historical and administrative center (seat) of Aguadilla, Puerto Rico

Aguadilla barrio-pueblo Barrio Pueblo Aguadilla
- Municipality Seat
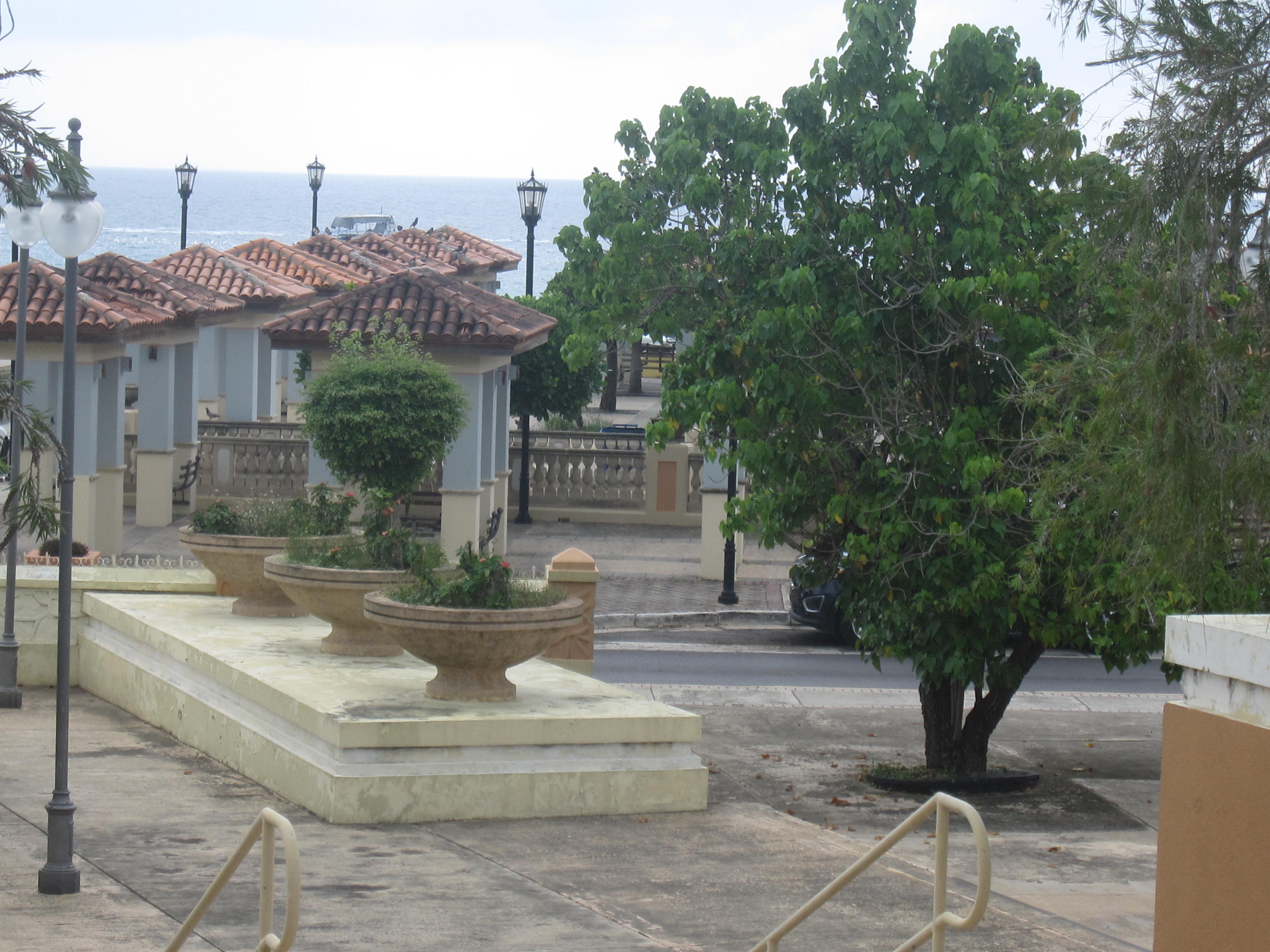
- El Parterre

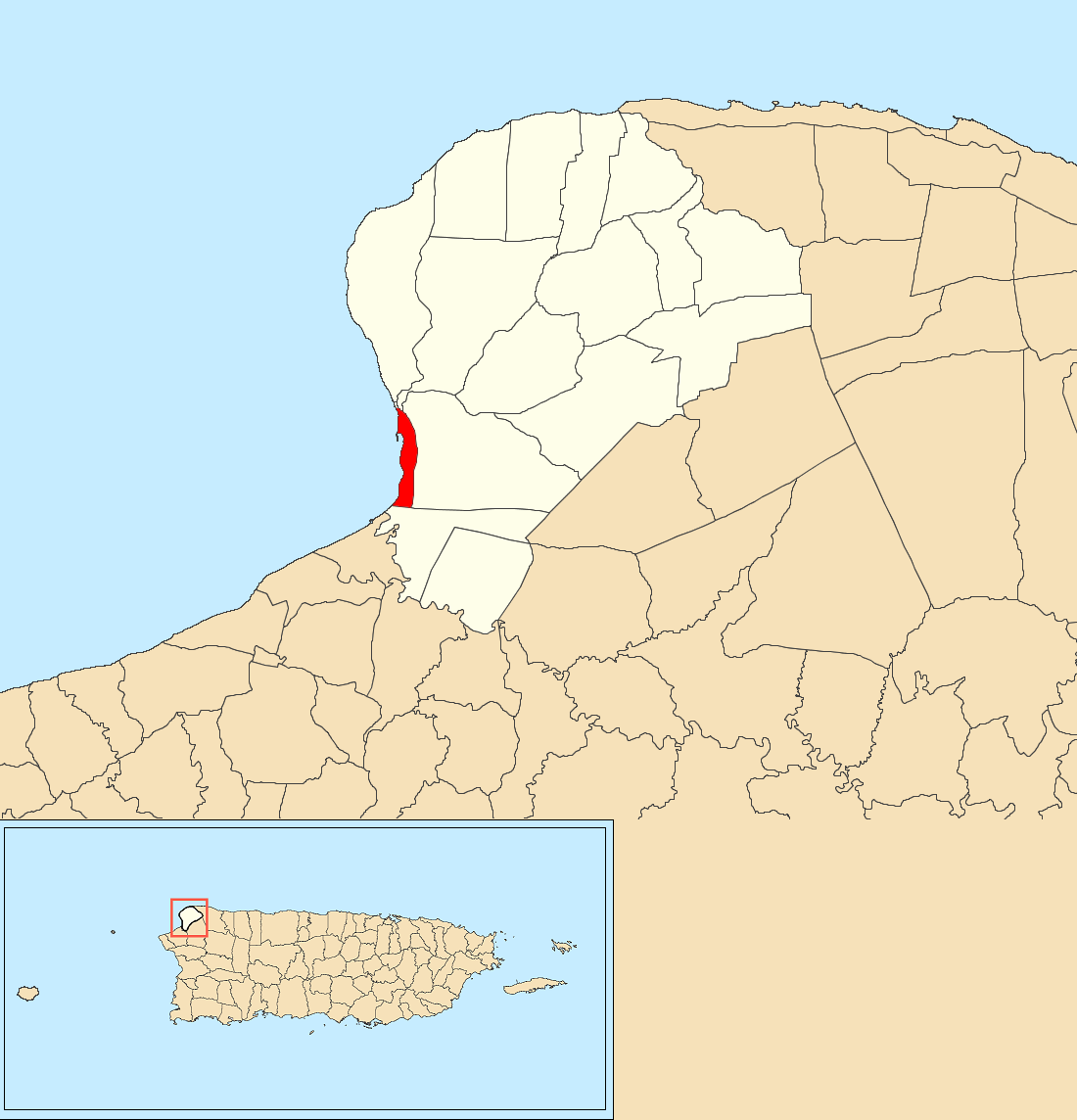

- Location of Puerto Rico
- Coordinates: 18°25′47″N 67°09′20″W
- Commonwealth: Puerto Rico
- Municipality: Aguadilla

Area
  - Total: 0.74 sq mi (1.9 km^{2})
  - Land: 0.37 sq mi (0.96 km^{2})
  - Water: 0.37 sq mi (0.96 km^{2})
- Elevation: 0 ft (0 m)

Population (2010)
  - Total: 3,627
  - Density: 9,802.7/sq mi (3,784.8/km^{2})
- Source: 2010 Census
- Time zone: UTC−4 (AST)

Aguadilla barrio-pueblo is an urban barrio and the administrative center (seat) of Aguadilla, a municipality of Puerto Rico. Its population in 2010 was 3,627.

As was customary in Spain, in Puerto Rico, the municipality has a barrio called pueblo which contains a central plaza, the municipal buildings (city hall), and a Catholic church. Fiestas patronales (patron saint festivals) are held in the central plaza every year.

Historical population
Census	Pop.	Note	%±
1910	6,135		—
1920	8,035		31.0%
1930	10,952		36.3%
1940	13,468		23.0%
1950	18,276		35.7%
1960	15,943		−12.8%
1970	0		−100.0%
1980	7,432		—
1990	5,311		−28.5%
2000	4,884		−8.0%
2010	3,627		−25.7%
U.S. Decennial Census; 1899 (shown as 1900) 1910-1930; 1930-1950 1980-2000 2010

== The central plaza and its church ==
The central plaza, or square, is a place for official and unofficial recreational events and a place where people can gather and socialize from dusk to dawn. The Laws of the Indies, Spanish law, which regulated life in Puerto Rico in the early 19th century, stated the plaza's purpose was for "the parties" (celebrations, festivities) (Spanish: a propósito para las fiestas), and that the square should be proportionally large enough for the number of neighbors (Spanish: grandeza proporcionada al número de vecinos). These Spanish regulations also stated that the streets nearby should be comfortable portals for passersby, protecting them from the elements: sun and rain.

Located across the central plaza in Aguadilla barrio-pueblo is the Parroquia San Carlos Borromeo, a Roman Catholic church. Its construction began in 1776 and was completed in 1783. It was remodeled in 1855. One of its towers collapsed during the 1918 San Fermín earthquake and the facade was changed when reconstructed. Its last remodeling was in 1971. It was listed in the National Register of Historic Places (NRHP) in 1984.

== Landmarks and places of interest ==
- The Aguadilla Town Square (Plaza de Recreo de Aguadilla), as is customary in Puerto Rico, is home to the city hall and Catholic church, the NRHP-listed San Carlos Borromeo Parish Church.
- The Amparo Roldán House (Casa Amparo Roldán), also known as the Casa de Piedra, which survived the 1918 earthquake, is the only remaining historic house of its era.
- El Parterre is a historic NRHP-listed public square which hosts a water spring (Ojo de Agua) around which the town of Aguadilla was settled.
- Fort Concepción (Fuerte de la Concepción) was the largest Spanish fortress in the region. The fortress was torn down at the end of the 19th century but its last surviving building still remains.
- The López House (Residencia López) is a historic NRHP-listed Neoclassical building.
- The new Museum of Art of Aguadilla and the Caribbean (Museo de Arte de Aguadilla y del Caribe) is located in the NRHP-listed Cardona House, a well preserved Neoclassical residence.
- The old Museum of Fine Arts of Aguadilla (Museo de Bellas Artes de Aguadilla) is located in a former District Courthouse, which was designed by famed Puerto Rican architect Rafael Carmoega.
- The NRHP-listed Old Urban Cemetery (Antiguo Cementerio Urbano) was originally divided into sections for Catholics and non-Catholics. Many illustrious Puerto Ricans, such as painter Rafael Arroyo Gely, are buried there.
- The Paseo Miguel Garcia Méndez is a malecón (or waterfront promenade) containing seafood restaurants, bars and monuments such as the Fisherman's Monument (Monumento al Pescador).
- Rompeolas Beach (Playa Rompeolas) is the main beach in the downtown area of Aguadilla.

== Sectors ==
Barrios (which are, in contemporary times, roughly comparable to minor civil divisions) in turn are further subdivided into smaller local populated place areas/units called sectores (sectors in English). The types of sectores may vary, from normally sector to urbanización to reparto to barriada to residencial, among others.

The following sectors are in Barrio Pueblo (Norte):

Avenida Los Robles, Calle Barbosa, Calle Ceiba, Calle Duda, Calle Fuerte, Calle Reguero, Calle Stahl, Callejón del Fuerte, Cerro Juan Vega, Condominio Cuesta Vieja, El Chapey, El Perú, Joya Las Marinas, Residencial Cuesta Vieja, Residencial Puesta del Sol, Sector Cerro Los Condenados (Cuesta Vieja), Sector Cerro Reguero, Sector Cuesta Nueva, Sector Cuesta Vieja, Sector La Vía (Norte), Sector Llanos Jiménez, Sector Luquillo, and Sector Tamarindo.

The following sectors are in Barrio Pueblo (Sur y Centro):

Avenida San Carlos, Barriada Visbal, Barrio Higuey, Barrio Iglesias, Calle Mercado, Calle Mercedes Moreno, Calle Progreso, Cerro Cabrera, Cerro Calero, Cerro Echevarría, Cerro Gonzalo, Condominio Torres del Sol, Condominio Villa Mar, Residencial Villamar, Salsipuedes, Santa Bárbara, Sector Campo Alegre, Sector Cerro Las Ánimas, Sector Gregorio Vélez Vaz, Sector Joyas San Carlos, and Sector La Vía (Sur).

== Gallery ==
The following places are in Aguadilla barrio-pueblo:

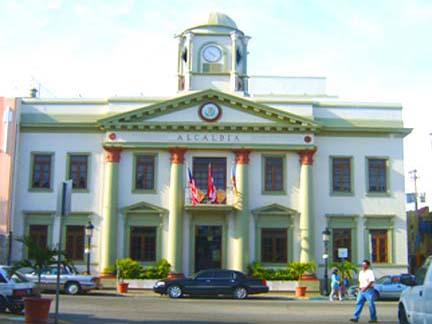
Aguadilla City Hall

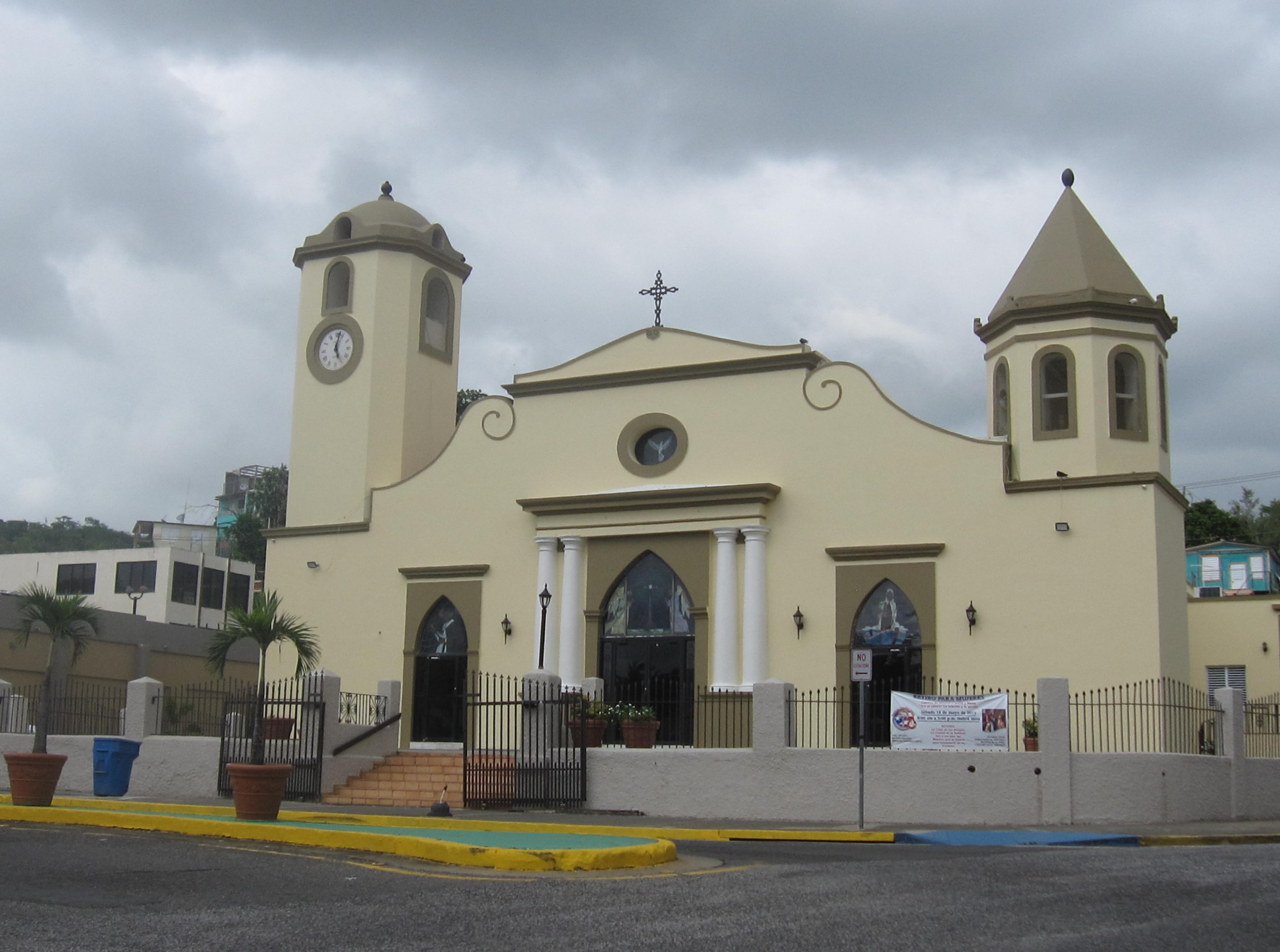
Catholic church in Aguadilla central plaza

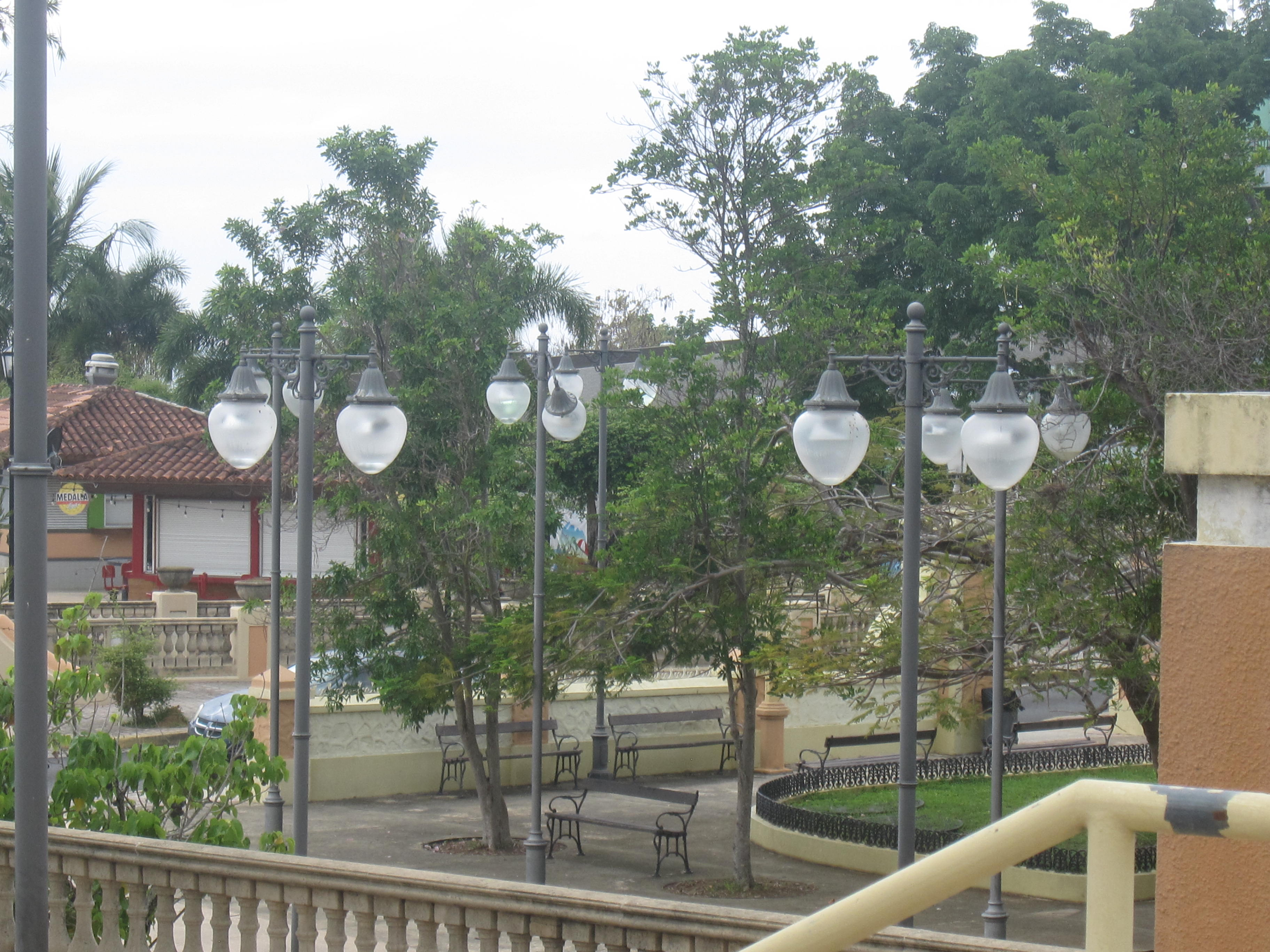
El Parterre

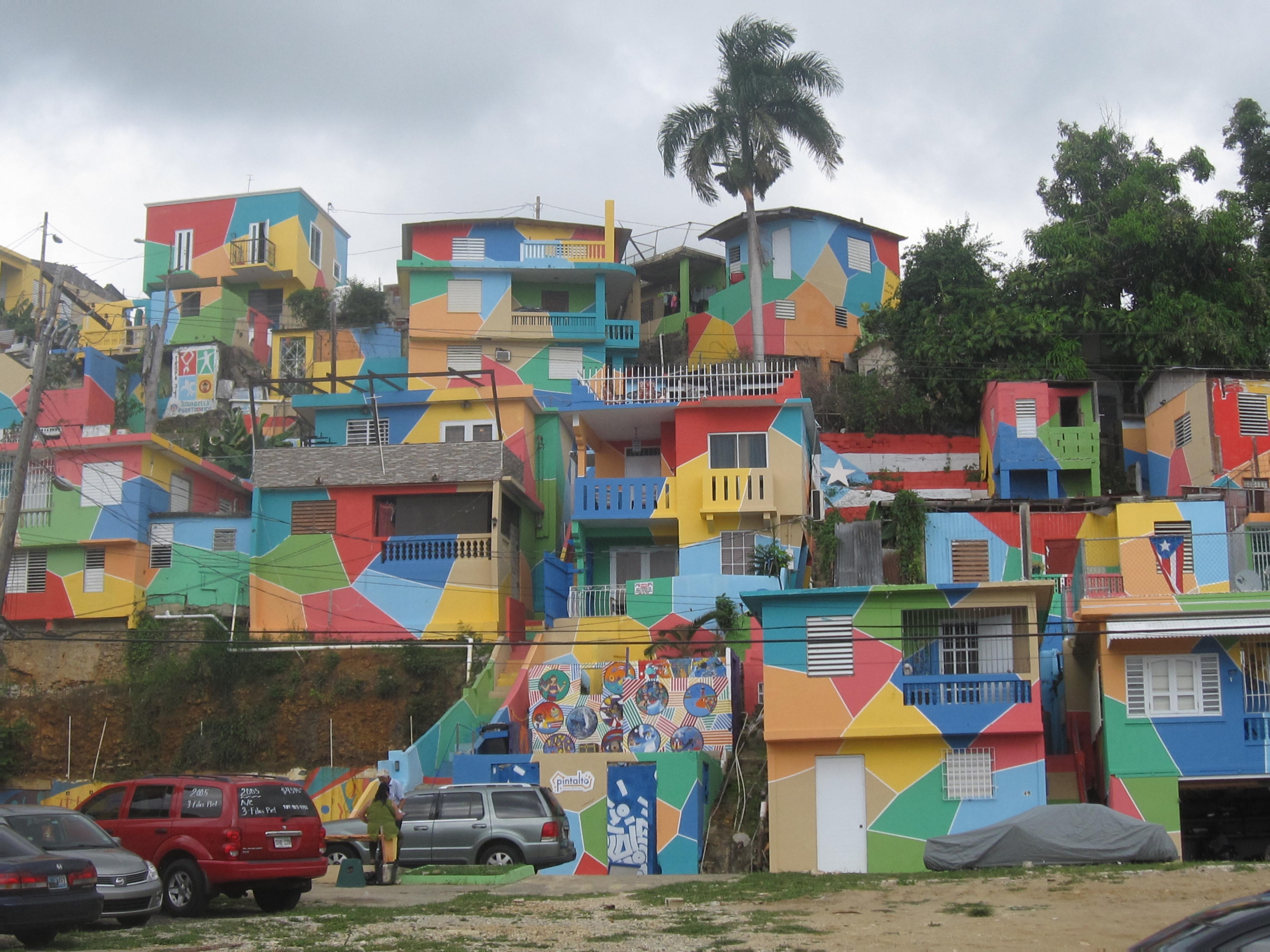
Colorful buildings adjacent to the plaza

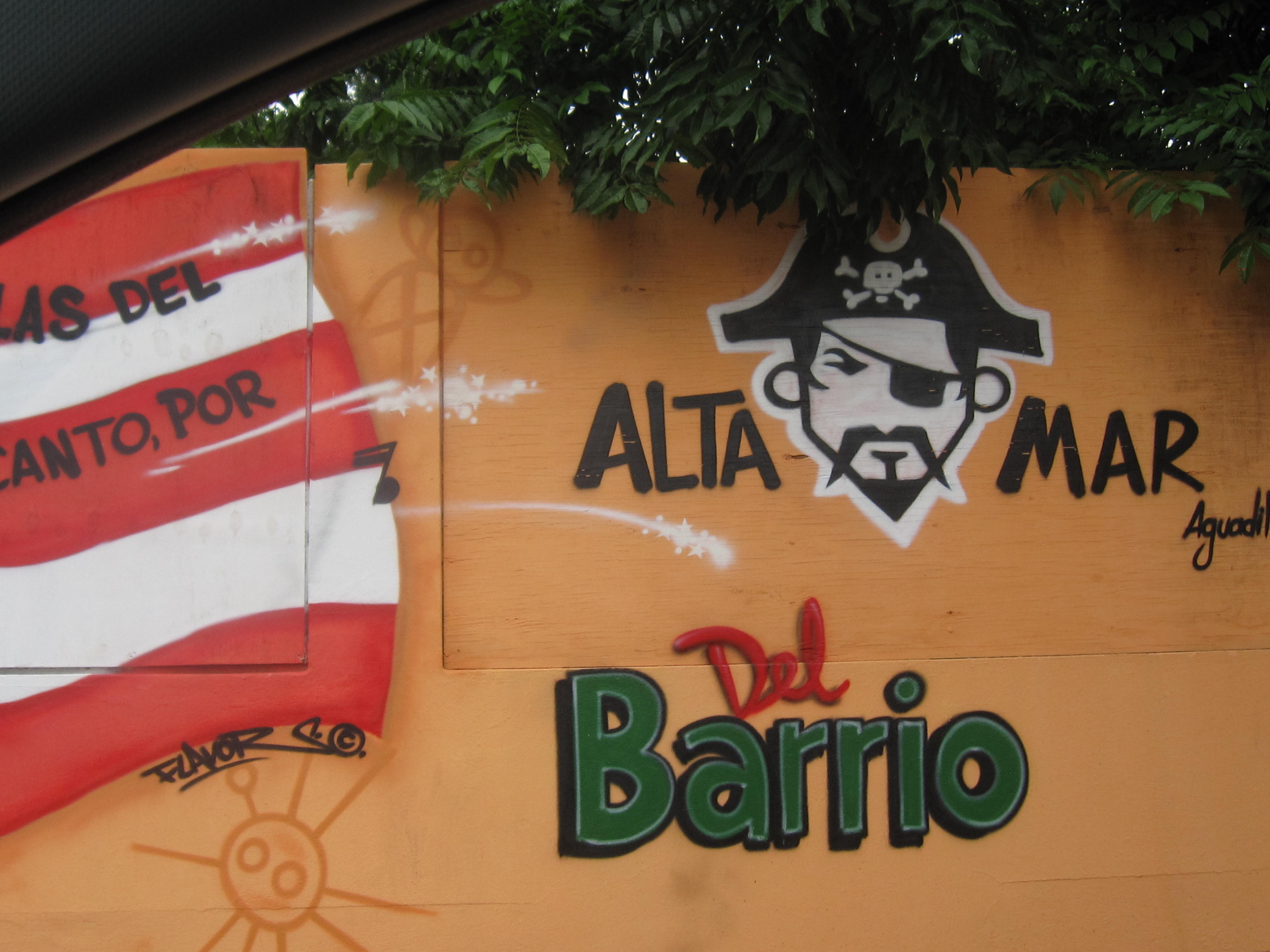
Street art adjacent to the plaza

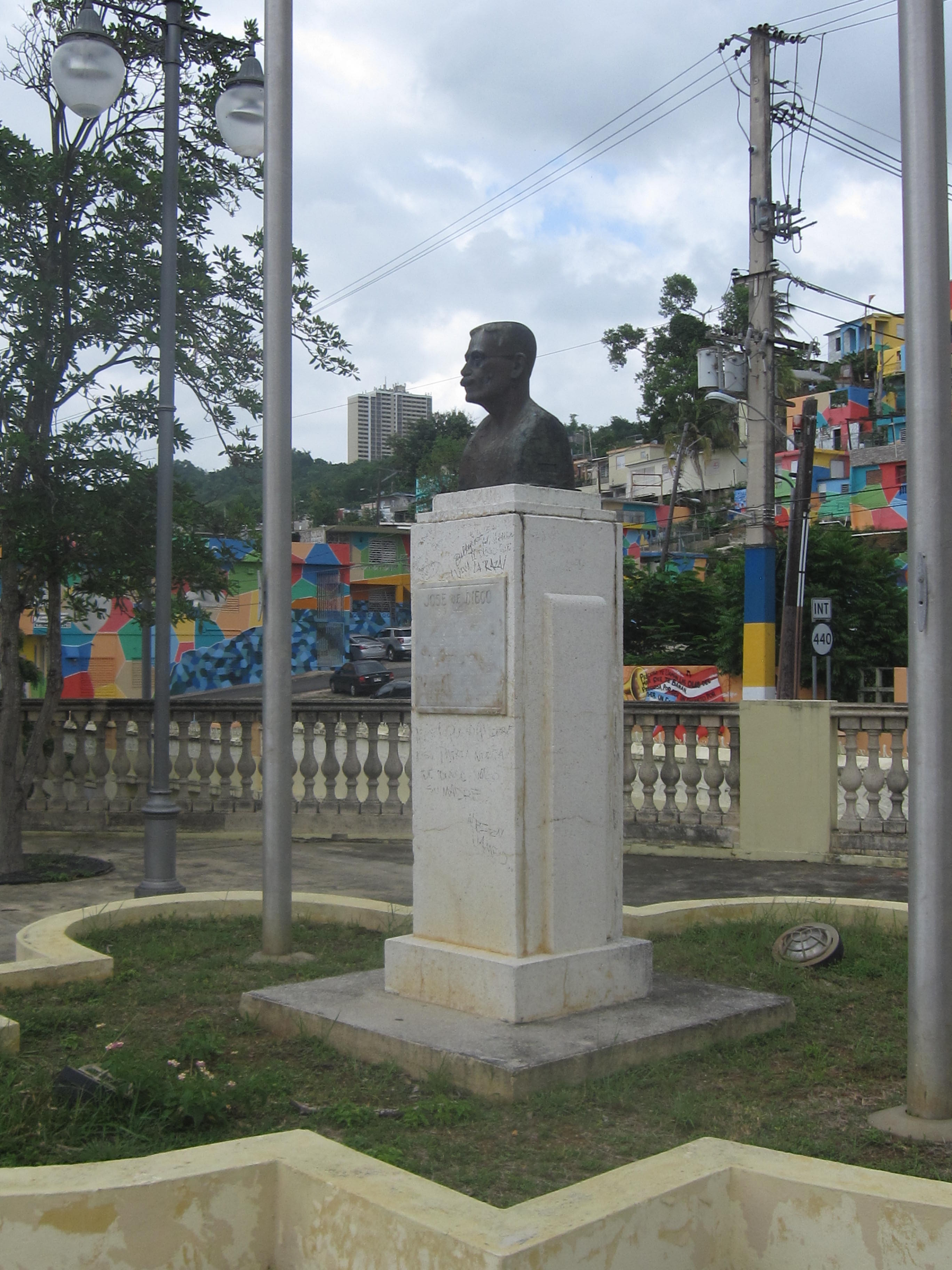
Statue of José de Diego

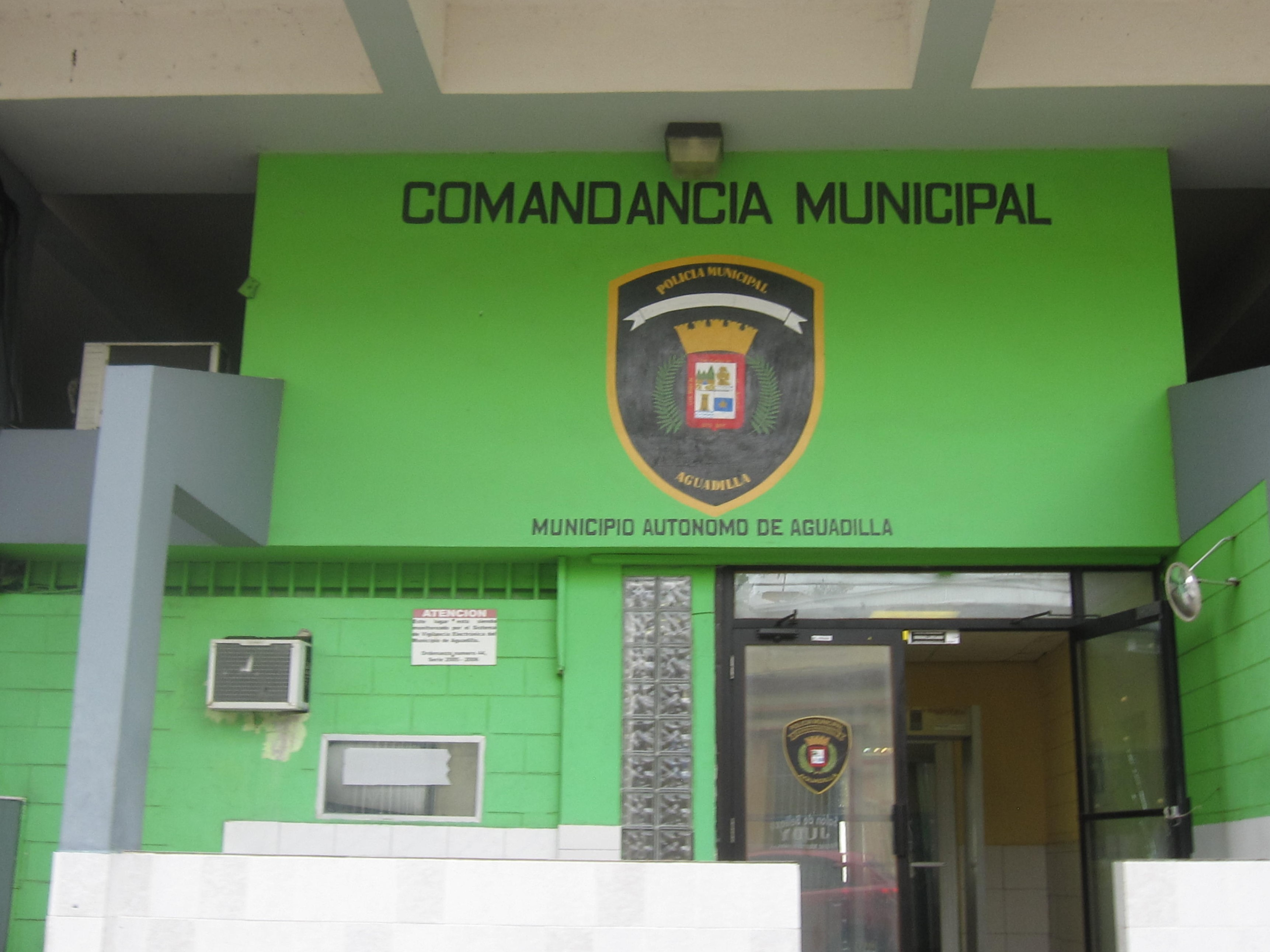
Police headquarters

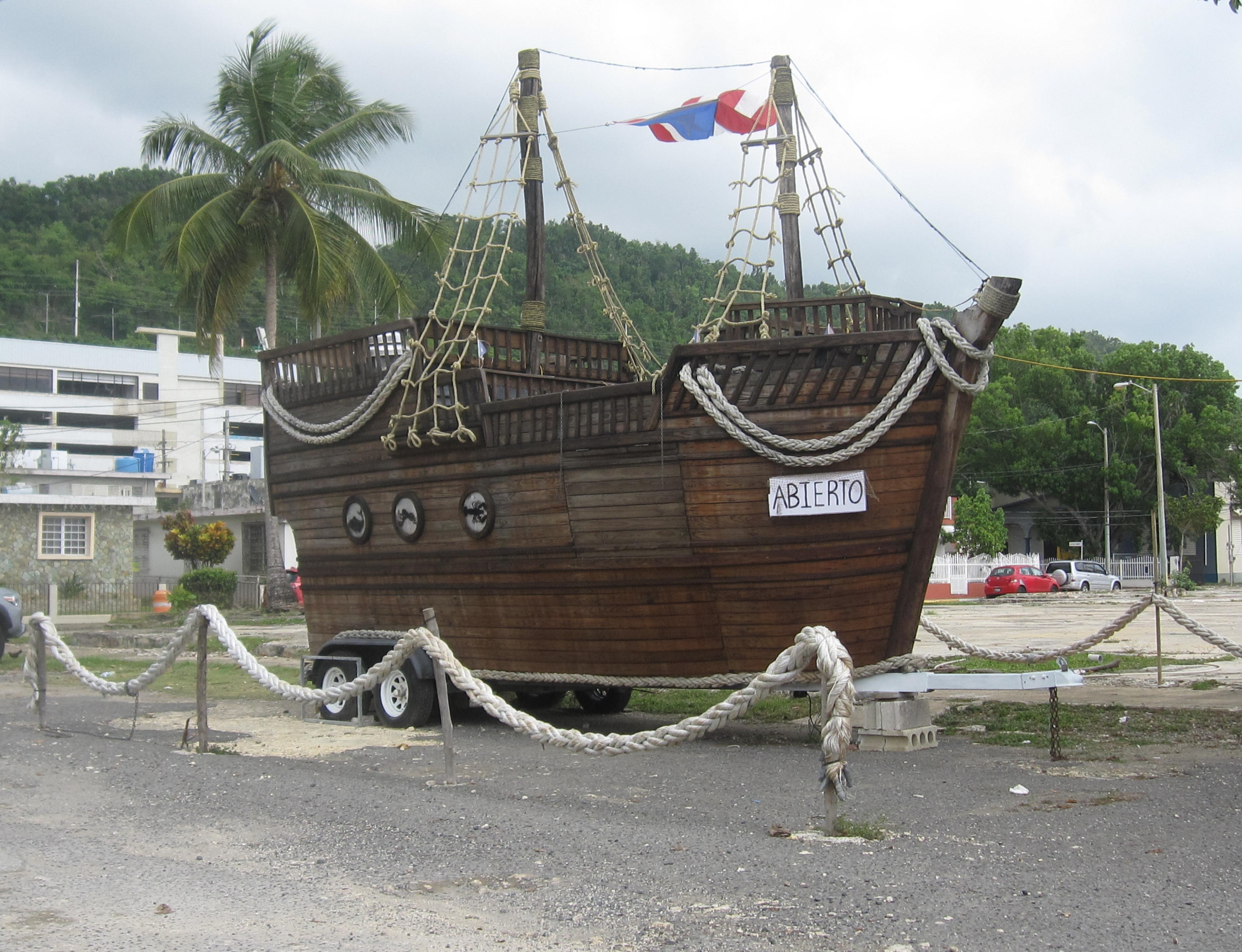
Wooden boat on waterfront

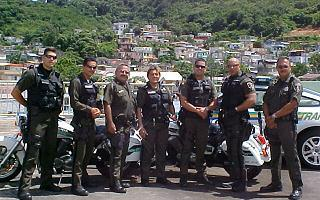
Aguadilla police

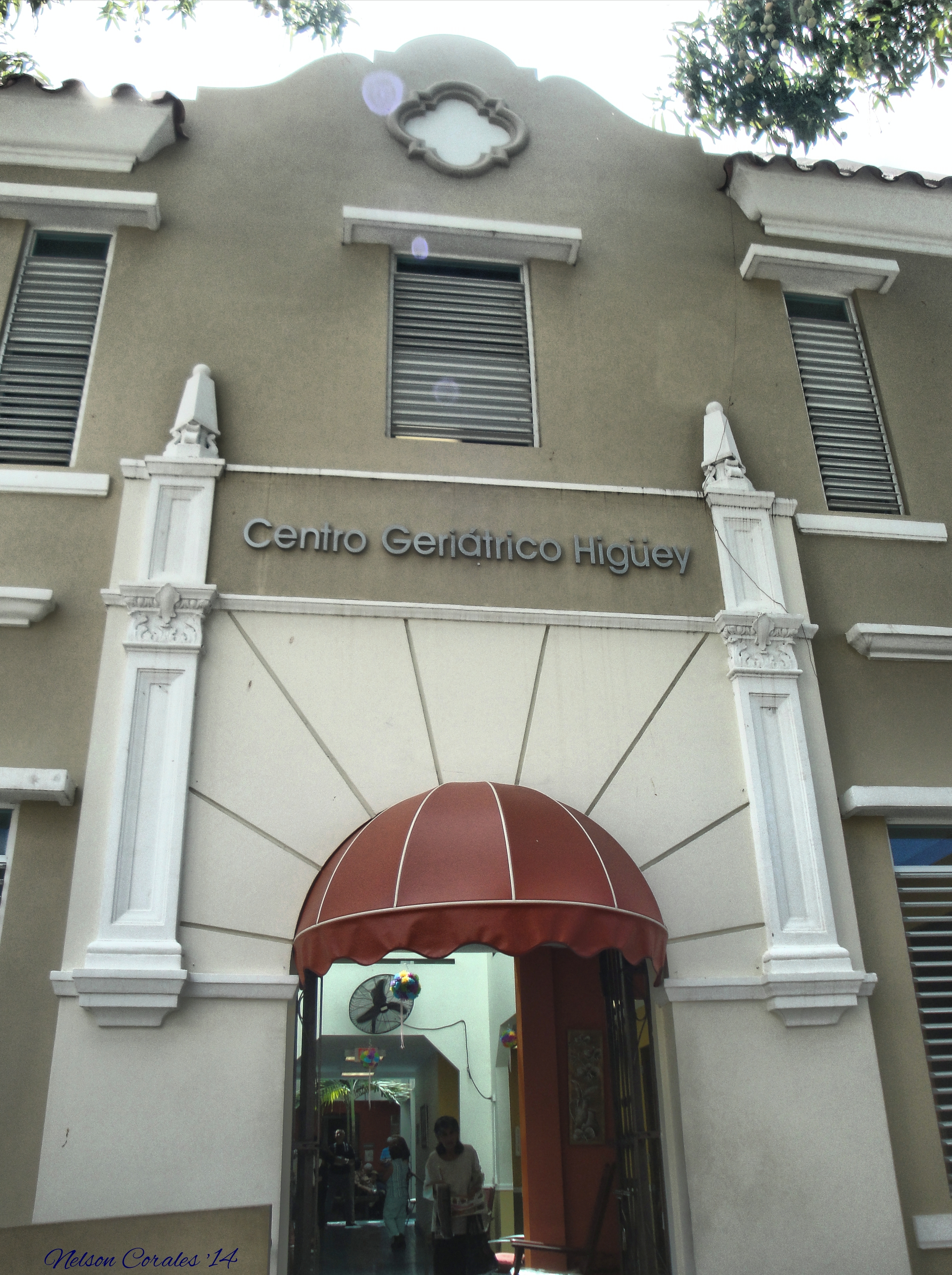
Centro Geriátrico Higüey nursing home

== See also ==
- List of communities in Puerto Rico
- List of barrios and sectors of Aguadilla, Puerto Rico
- National Register of Historic Places listings in Aguadilla, Puerto Rico
