= José de Jesús Esteves =

Puerto Rican poet and judge (1882–1918)

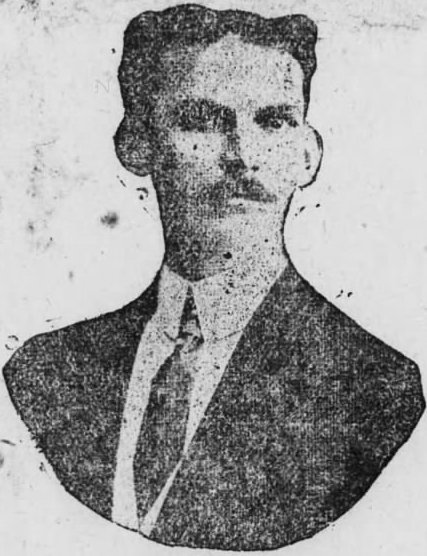
- Esteves in a 1918 newspaper
- Born: October 15, 1882; Aquadilla, Puerto Rico
- Died: November 1, 1918 (aged 36); New York City, New York, U.S.
- Resting place: Old Urban Cemetery; Aquadilla, Puerto Rico
- Education: University of the Potomac
- Occupations: Poet; lawyer; judge; publisher

José de Jesús Esteves (October 15, 1882 - November 1, 1918) was a Puerto Rican poet, lawyer, and judge in the Manatí Municipal Court. He was an expositor of the Modernismo literary movement, wrote a number of verse books and poems, and was a newspaper publisher.

== Early life ==
José de Jesús Esteves was born on October 15, 1882, in Aguadilla, Puerto Rico. He attended schools in his hometown and taught himself accounting.

== Career ==
Esteves worked as a bookkeeper in Aguadilla, Humacao, Mayagüez, and San Juan. In 1906, Esteves was director of El Pueblo of Arecibo. He studied law via correspondence with the University of the Potomac and graduated in 1912. Starting in 1911, he was associated with the Puerto Rico Ilustrado and in 1913 became associated with the Revista de las Antillas. He published the El Eco Juvenil and Fiat Lux newspapers.

Esteves was a poet and competed in literary contests in Puerto Rico. His poetry was influenced by Parnassian poet Luis O'Neill and José Agustin Aponte, a romantic poet who wrote in a Miroan style. He was an expositor of the Modernismo literary movement. He wrote three verse books, Besos y Plumas (Kisses and Pens) (1901), Crisálidas (Chrysalises) (1909), and Rosal de Amor (Rosebush of Love) (1917). His most famous works are "Sinfonía Helénica" (Greek Symphony), "Ronda de Anforas" (Round of Anforas), "El Ladrón" (The Thief), "Sauce Lírico" (Lyric Willow), and "Alma Adentro" (Soul Inside). In 1913, his poem "Alma Adentro" won a contest in Revista Mundial of Paris.

Esteves campaigned with the Federal and Unionist parties of Puerto Rico. He was a judge in Manatí Municipal Court.

== Personal life ==
Esteves explored different religions, including Catholic, Mason, Spiritist, and free thinker.

Towards the end of his life, Esteves was at a sanatorium undergoing treatment for neurasthenia. He died on November 1, 1918, in New York City. His tomb is in the Old Urban Cemetery of Aguadilla, Puerto Rico.
