= Casa Alcaldía de Arecibo =

- U.S. National Register of Historic Places
- Puerto Rico Historic Sites and Zones
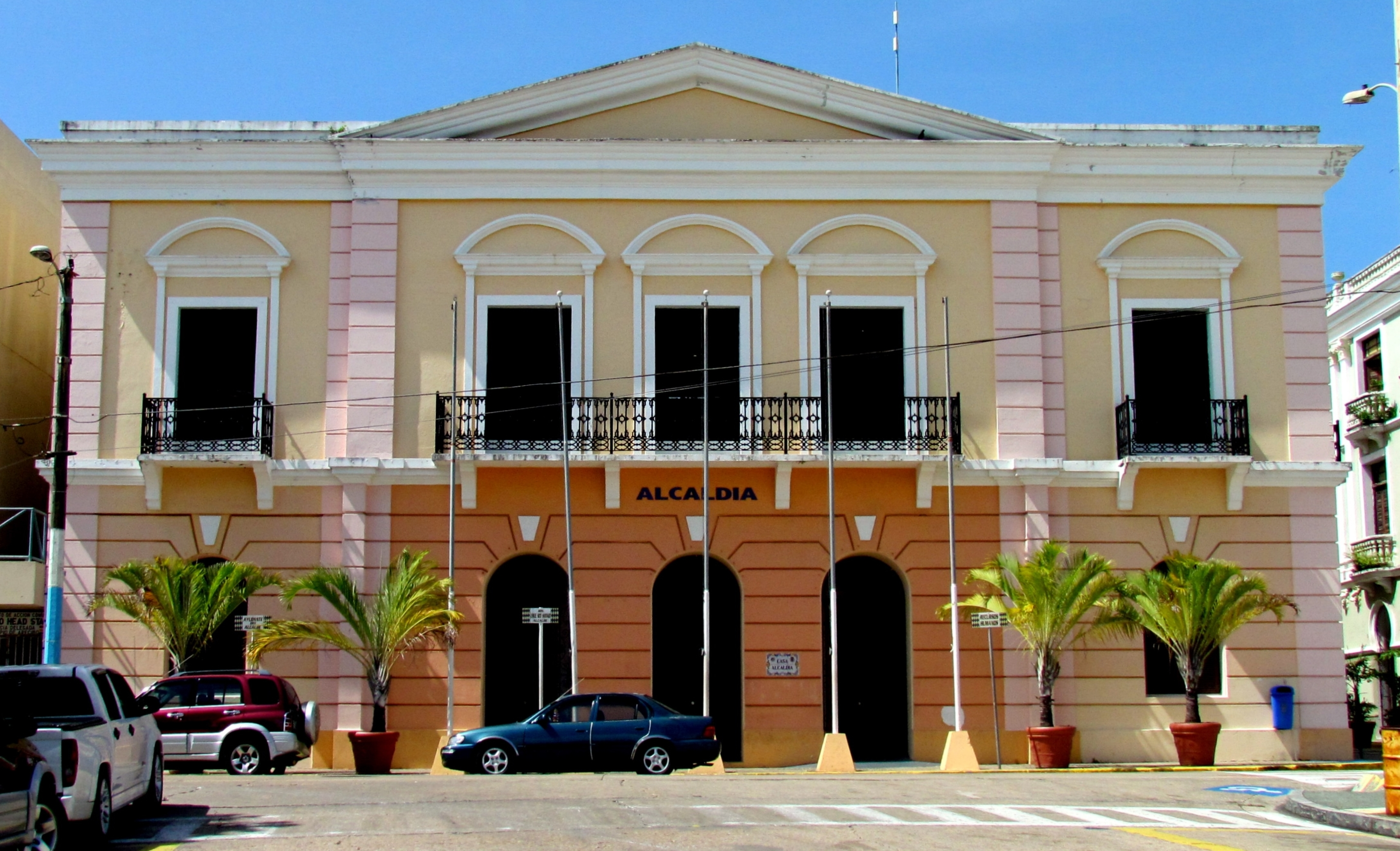
- City hall, September 2011.

- Location within Puerto Rico
- Location: Town square & José De Diego Avenue, Arecibo, Puerto Rico
- Coordinates: 18°28′21″N 66°42′56″W
- Built: 1850-1866
- Architectural style: Classical Revival
- NRHP reference No.: 86002762
- RNSZH No.: 2000-(RN)-20-JP-SH

Significant dates
- Added to NRHP: September 29, 1986
- Designated RNSZH: December 21, 2000

Casa Alcaldía de Arecibo (Spanish for Arecibo City Hall), formerly known as the Casa Consistorial, is the historic city hall and municipal administrative headquarters of the Puerto Rican municipality of Arecibo located in the Plaza Mayor in downtown Arecibo (Arecibo Pueblo). Constructed by the Spanish between 1850 and 1866, more than 155 years ago, this government building exhibits the standard Neoclassic style that distinguishes the Spanish architecture of the time. The building was added to the National Register of Historic Places in 1986, and to the Puerto Rico Register of Historic Sites and Zones in 2000.

== History ==
The building is one of the finest examples of the civil architecture of the reign of Queen Isabel II in the region. This two-story structure uses elements of design typical of the neo-classical vocabulary which dominated Spain and her possessions during the 19th century. Together with the Cathedral of Arecibo, also on the Plaza Mayor, this structure set the trends in this region for the construction of civilian and other important structures. Historically, as the political center for the whole northwest region of Puerto Rico, many crucial government decisions were forged by the mayors of Arecibo from this City Hall.

In 1866, it claimed the dubious honor of housing in its first-floor prison the Puerto Rican patriots that comprised the first and only rebellion against Spanish rule, the Grito de Lares. Among the imprisoned were several important political figures of 19th century Puerto Rican history, such as José Julián Acosta, Julián Blanco Sosa, Pedro Gerónimo Goyco and Calixto Romero. By the 1890s the prison had been turned into a storage area which ironically housed a marble statue of Queen Isabel II upon its removal from its pedestal on the town plaza. The 1918 Puerto Rico earthquake destroyed part of the frontal facade of the building. During the rebuilding process, modifications were made to the facade, and a tower and a clock were added to the town hall.

The Arecibo City Hall today stands as a example of 19th-century Spanish thought in architecture and government. Occupying a site on the Plaza Mayor in the town of Arecibo, the structure serves as a link between the city's past, present and future. The city hall also has a gallery dedicated figures in the culture and history of Arecibo.

== Gallery ==
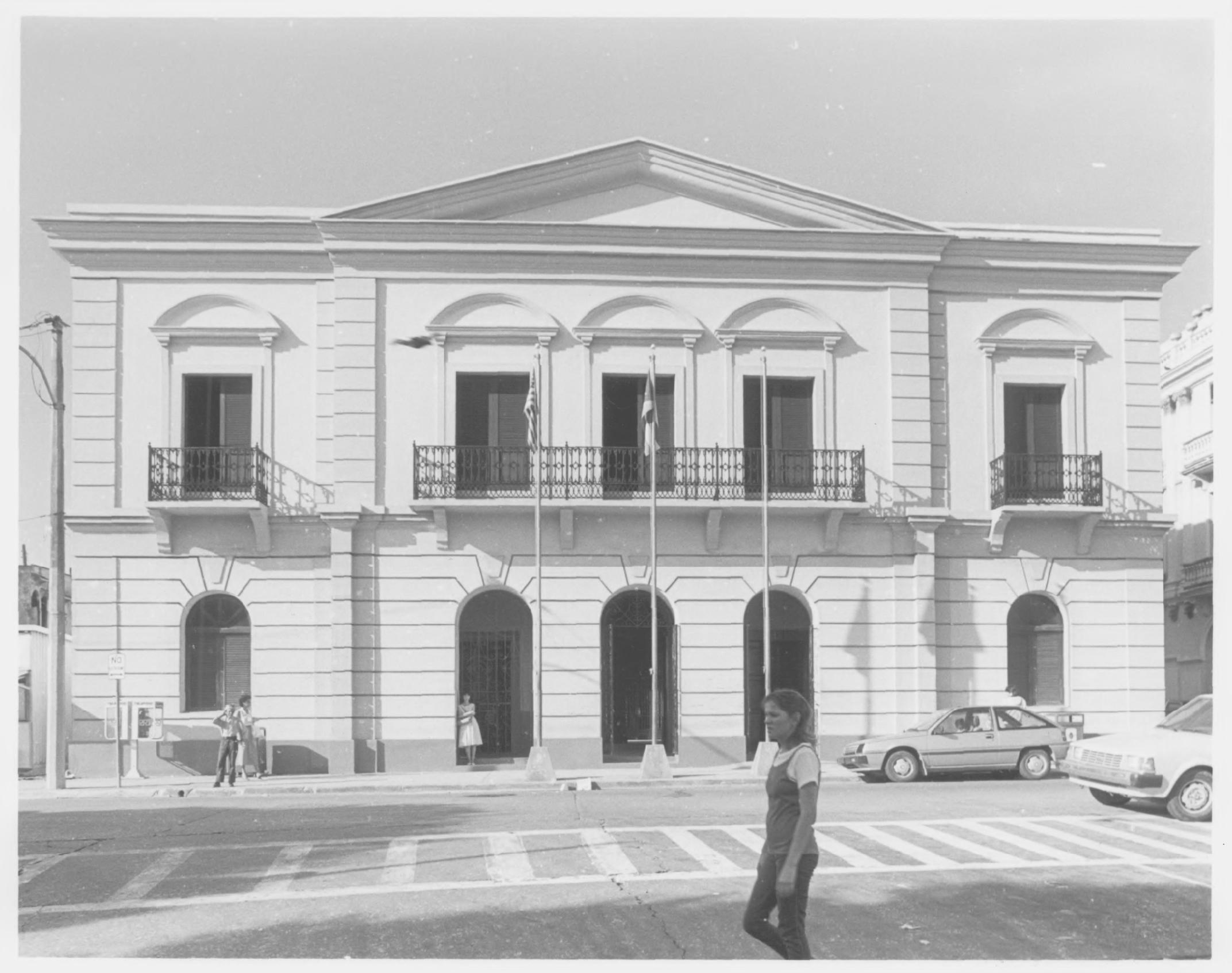
1986

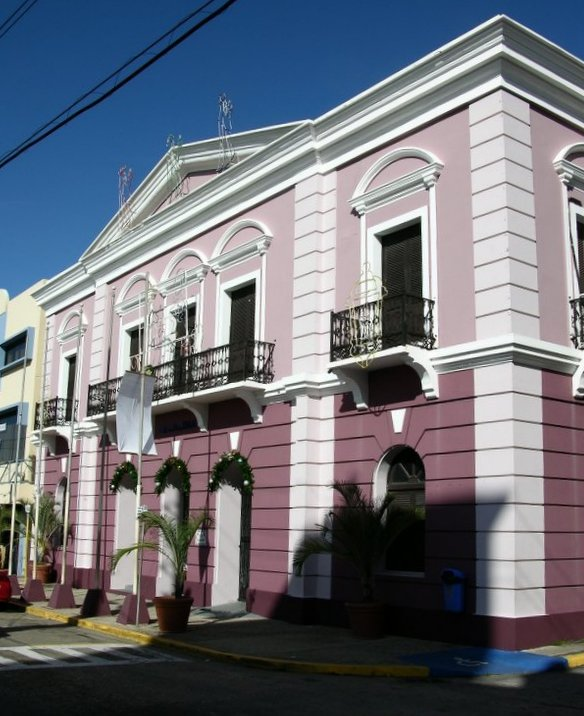
2006

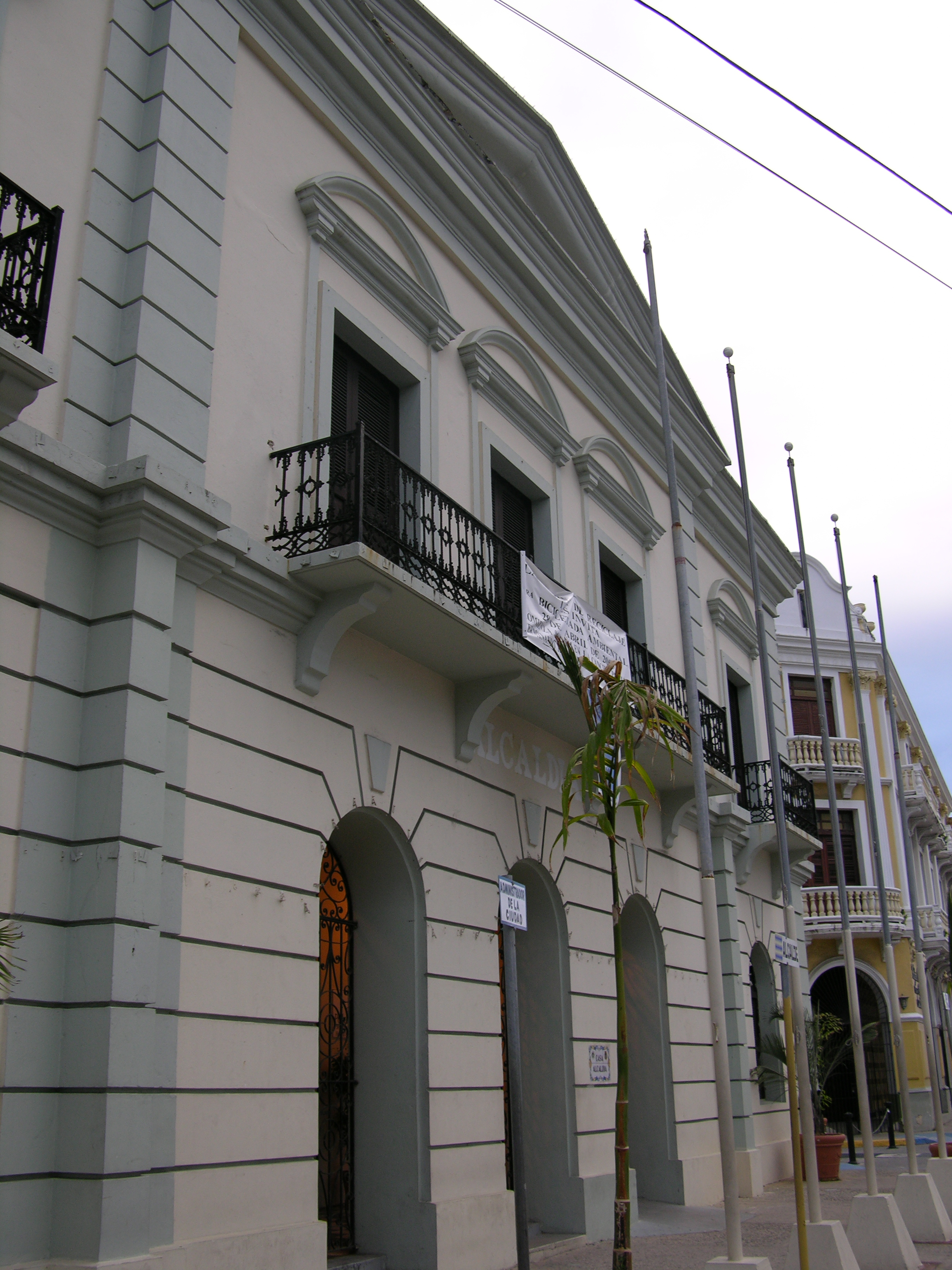
2007

== See also ==
- Catedral de San Felipe Apóstol
