= 1918 San Fermín earthquake =

Earthquake that struck Puerto Rico

- Location within Puerto Rico
- UTC time: 1918-10-11 14:14:42
- ISC event: 913306
- USGS-ANSS: ComCat
- Local date: October 11, 1918
- Local time: 10:14:42
- Magnitude: 7.1 M_{w}
- Depth: 15 km (9.3 mi)
- Epicenter: 18.80°N 67.22°W
- Type: Unknown
- Areas affected: Puerto Rico
- Total damage: $4–29 million USD
- Max. intensity: MMI IX (Violent)
- Tsunami: Yes
- Casualties: 76–118

The 1918 San Fermín earthquake, also known as the Puerto Rico earthquake of 1918, struck the island of Puerto Rico at 10:14:42 local time on October 11. The earthquake measured 7.1 on the moment magnitude scale and IX (Violent) on the Mercalli intensity scale. The mainshock epicenter occurred off the northwestern coast of the island, somewhere along the Puerto Rico Trench.

The earthquake triggered a tsunami that swept the west coast of the island. The combined effects of the earthquake and tsunami made it one of the worst natural disasters that have struck the island. The losses resulting from the disaster were approximately 76–118 casualties and $4–29 million in property damage.

== Earthquake ==
The epicenter of the 1918 San Fermín earthquake was located in the Mona Passage off the northwestern coast of the island. The strongest ground shaking has been estimated at intensity IX on the Mercalli intensity scale. The resulting tsunami affected primarily the west coast towns of the island, primarily Aguadilla and Mayaguez.

=== Damage ===
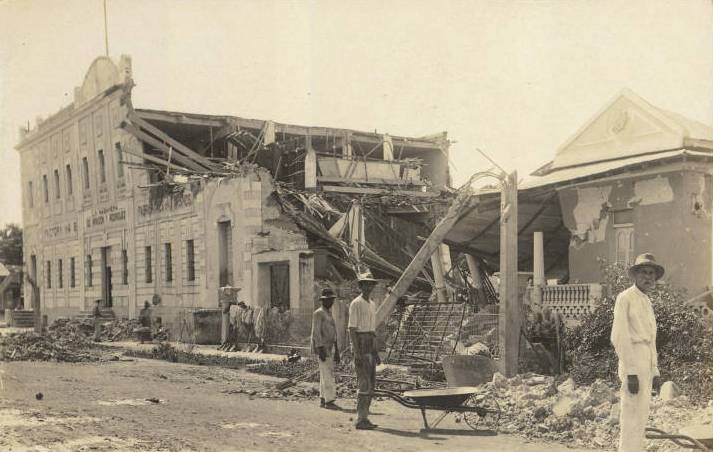
Damage caused to the "La Habanera de Infanzón y Rodríguez" building in Mayagüez

Numerous structures in the west coast suffered irreparable damage. Factories and production facilities were virtually destroyed, while bridges and roads were severely damaged. The earthquake caused several mudslides in areas where the intensity exceeded Level VII, but none caused numerous deaths. River currents were also affected, which, in many cases affected the foundations of many bridges, resulted in their collapse. Telegraph cables under the ocean were damaged, cutting off the island from outside communication for a time.

The reported casualties of the earthquake have been estimated somewhere between 76 and 116 deaths. Approximately 40 of these deaths were caused by the tsunami which swept shore communities. Damage to property was estimated to be between $4 and 29 million.

In Aguadilla, the closest town to the earthquake epicenter, the parish church and most of the stone and concrete buildings were either destroyed or partially damaged. The nearby Spanish-built Punta Higuero lighthouse of Rincón was also severely damaged.

In Mayagüez, the largest city to be directly affected, 700 masonry buildings were damaged and 1,000 wooden houses, leaving many people homeless. Major buildings like the church, post office, municipal theater and city hall were severely damaged. With fear of the aftershocks, many camped out in the hills for weeks. Some of the buildings of the recently founded University of Puerto Rico campus were also damaged or destroyed. The Edificio José de Diego suffered structural damage and the Degetau Hall was destroyed with its main entrance portico being the only standing structure left intact. These ruins were later preserved, and its portico would later on become a local landmark and the official emblem of the institution today.

The historic center of San Germán was also badly affected, with reported damage to notable structures such as the main town church. Cities throughout the southern coast were also affected. The United States Customs House was destroyed while the Ponce city hall for example was damaged, prompting the mayoral office to temporarily relocated to the Parque de Bombas until 1920. Other damaged buildings in Ponce were the Tricoche Hospital and the Armstrong-Poventud House.

There was damage reported further afield throughout Puerto Rico, for example the original bell towers of the cathedral of Humacao and the main town church of Vega Baja also collapsed. The Corregimiento Plaza Theater, the cathedral and the city hall in Arecibo also sustained damage.

=== Tsunami ===
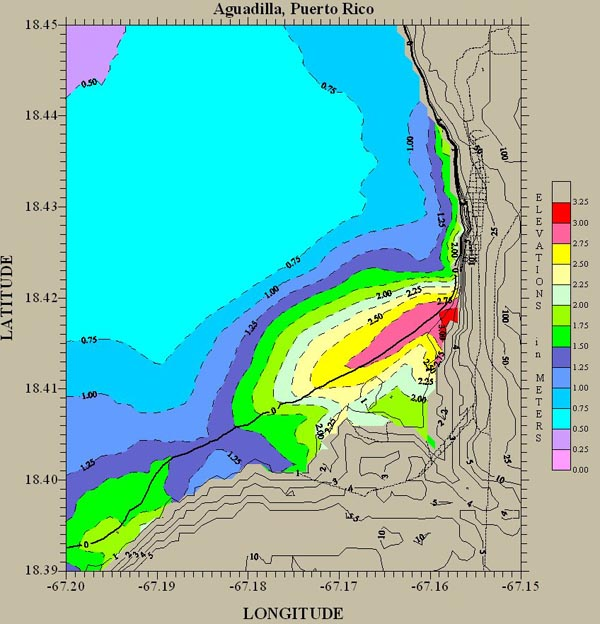
Simulation of the results of the tsunami on the coast of Aguadilla, Puerto Rico

As a result of the earthquake, a tsunami lashed the west coast of the island, probably 4–7 minutes after the main shock. The highest waves were estimated at 6.0 m (19.7 ft) in Point Agujereada, 4.5 m (15 ft) at Punta Borinquen (where it destroyed the lighthouse), and 5.2 m (17 ft) at Point Jiguero. Several coastal villages were destroyed, and it has been estimated that 40 people drowned (32 in Aguadilla alone) as a direct result of the tsunami. The earthquake and consequent tsunami destroyed most historic vernacular residences in downtown Aguadilla with only a few, such as the Amparo Roldán residence, surviving. Many of the historic tombs and mausolea of the historic cemetery were also badly damaged by the waves.

=== Aftershocks ===
Several aftershocks were reported immediately after the main earthquake. On October 24 and November 12, two strong aftershocks (6.4 and 6.1 Mw, respectively) were reported on the island. However, no damage was reported as a result.

== United States response ==
The response from the United States was to exempt the municipalities most affected from paying taxes for a short period immediately following the quake: those municipalities were Mayagüez, Aguada, Aguadilla, Añasco and Isabela. The U.S. appropriated funds for the repair of municipal buildings of the most affected municipalities.

== Gallery ==
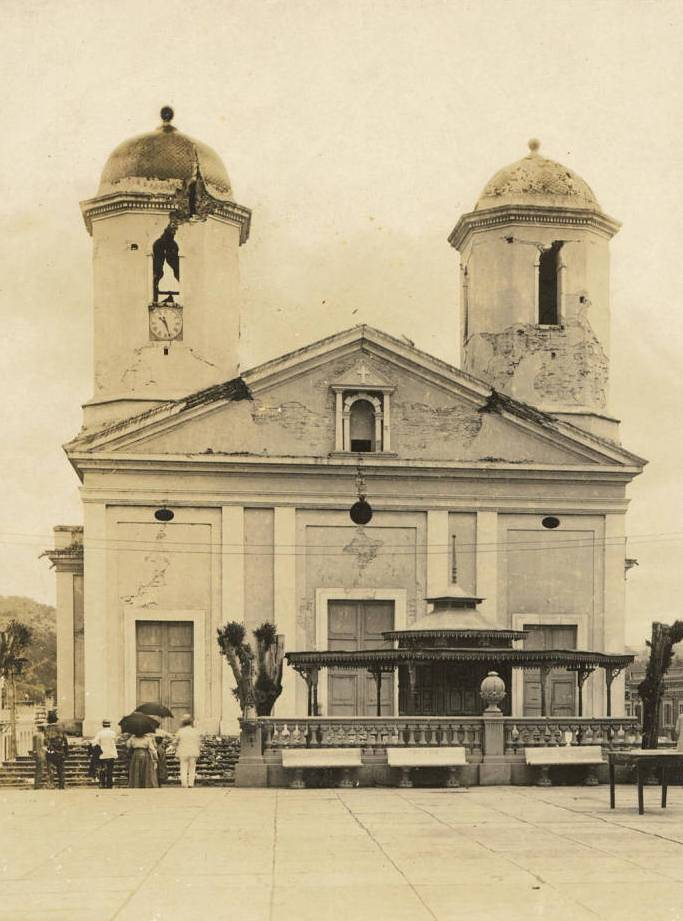
Cathedral of Mayagüez after the first earthquake; further damage toppled the left tower

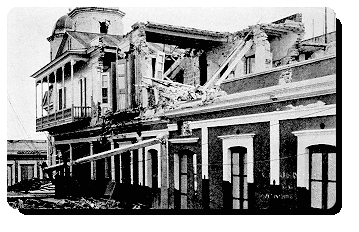
Destroyed brick homes in Mayagüez

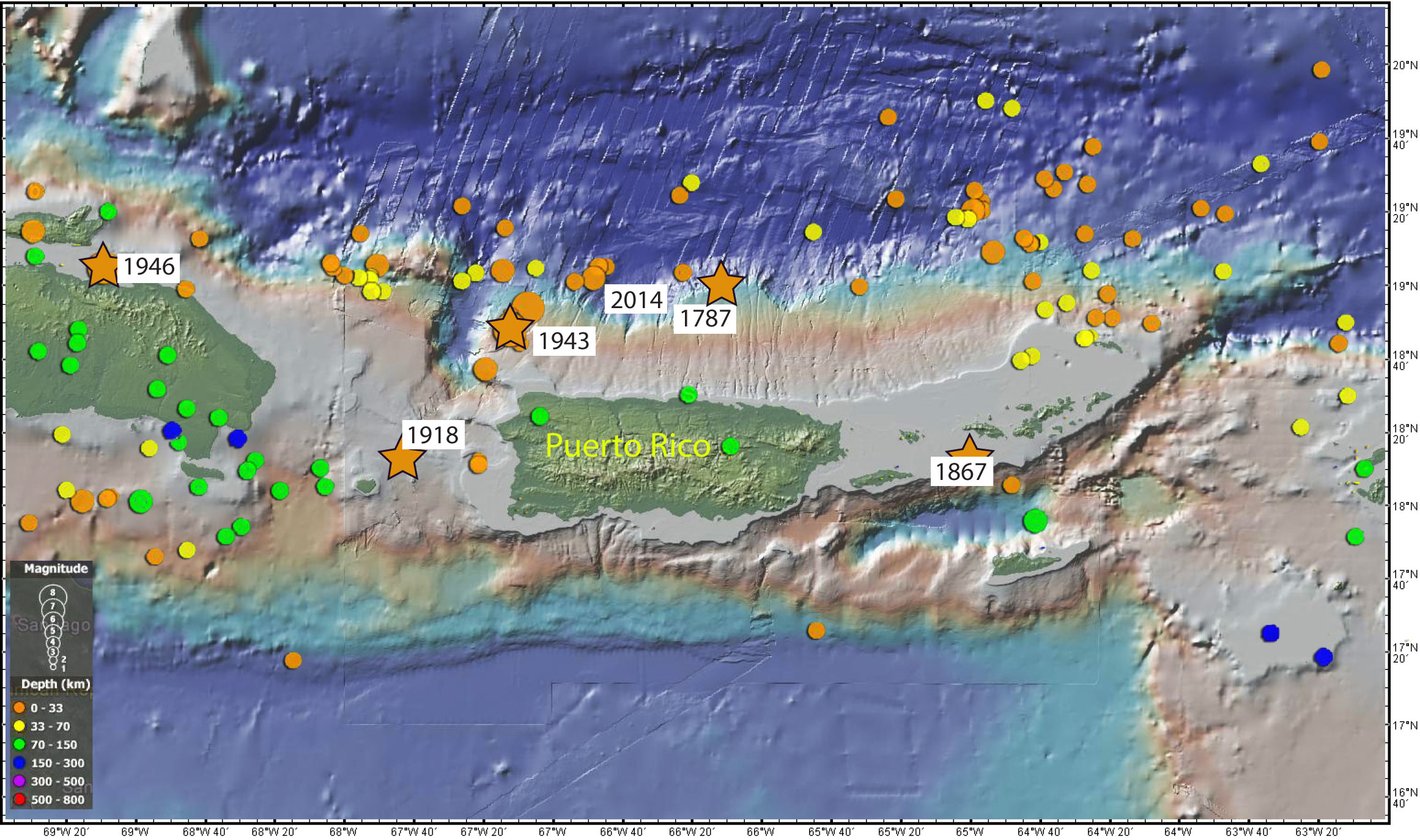
Map showing the epicenters of all the magnitude 5 and greater earthquakes around Puerto Rico for the last 100 years

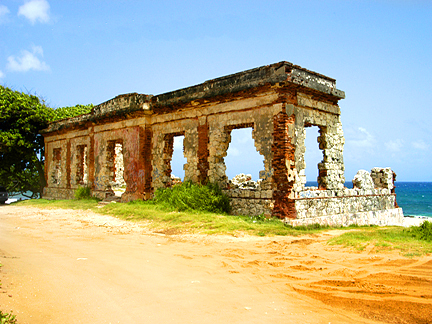
Aguadilla Punta Borinquen Lighthouse Ruins – an 1889 lighthouse destroyed by the tsunami

== See also ==
- 1787 Boricua earthquake
- 1867 Virgin Islands earthquake and tsunami
- 2019–20 Puerto Rico earthquakes
- Geology of Puerto Rico
- List of disasters in the United States by death toll
- List of earthquakes in 1918
- List of earthquakes in Puerto Rico and the Virgin Islands
- List of earthquakes in the Caribbean
