= Old Urban Cemetery =

Historic cemetery in Aguadilla, Puerto Rico

- U.S. National Register of Historic Places
- Puerto Rico Historic Sites and Zones
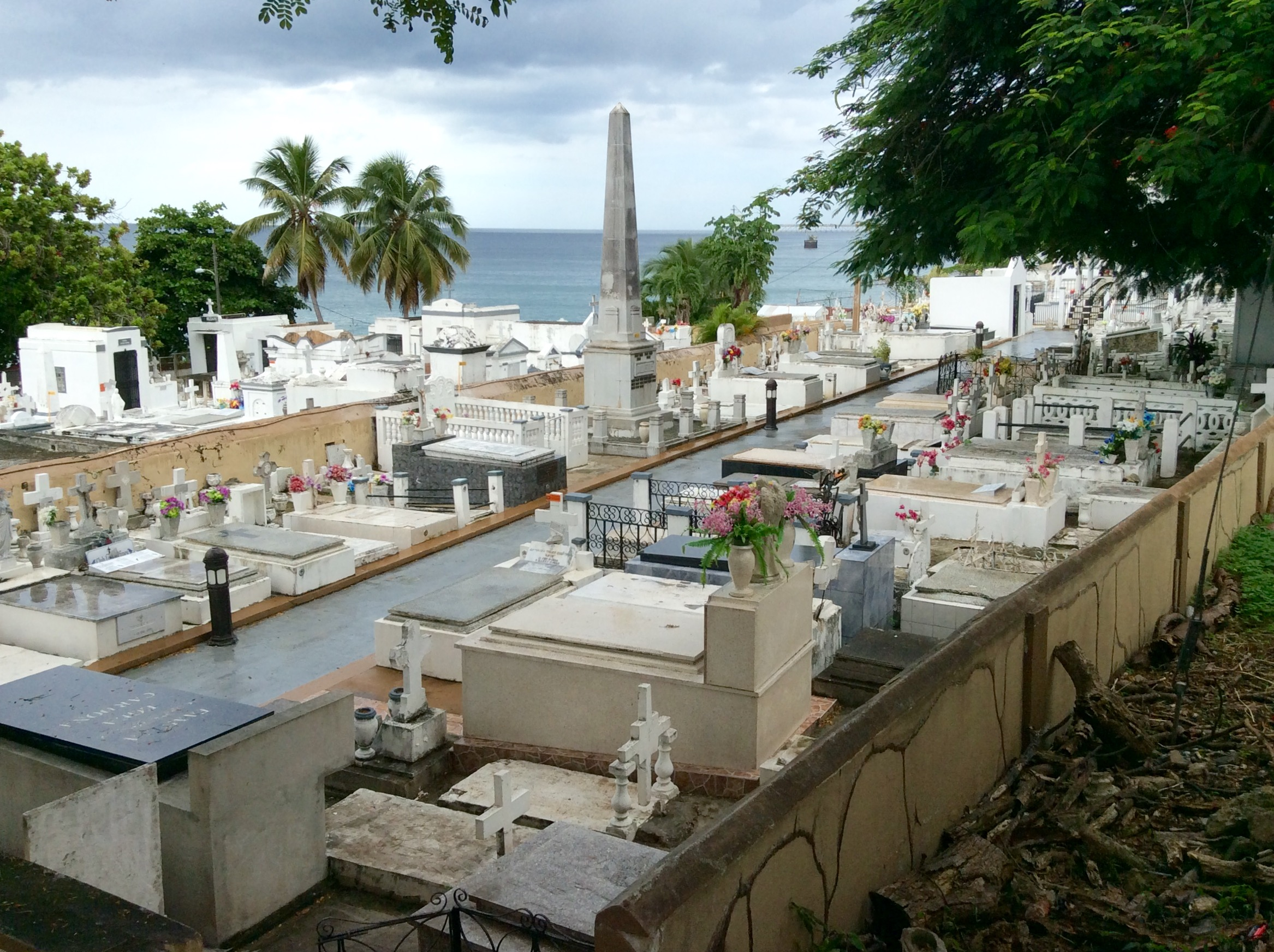

- Location within Puerto Rico
- Location: At the foot of Cuesta Vieja; Aguadilla, Puerto Rico
- Coordinates: 18°26′16″N 67°09′22″W
- Built: 1813
- Architect: Spanish Corps of Engineers
- NRHP reference No.: 85000042
- RNSZH No.: 2000-(RO)-19-JP-SH

Significant dates
- Added to NRHP: January 2, 1985
- Designated RNSZH: December 21, 2000

Old Urban Cemetery, also known as Cementerio Municipal, in Aguadilla, Puerto Rico, is a cemetery with burials dating back to 1813 or 1814. Near the town of Aguadilla's north entrance, it spreads between the beach and the foot of the mountain and is enclosed by mortar and stone walls. It is located at the foot of Cuesta Vieja, a sector of Aguadilla barrio-pueblo. Many of its older tombs, made of brick, stone and mortar, were damaged in a 1918 earthquake (presumably the 1918 San Fermín earthquake).

Use of the cemetery began when burials were no longer allowed in the churchyard. Graves include that of poet-laureat José de Jesús Esteves, painter Rafael Arroyo Gely, and Luis R. Esteves (the first Puerto Rican graduate of West Point).

The cemetery was originally divided into sections for Catholics and non-Catholics. It was listed on the National Register of Historic Places in 1985, and on the Puerto Rico Register of Historic Sites and Zones in 2000.

== See also ==
- National Register of Historic Places listings in western Puerto Rico
