= Iglesia de San Carlos Borromeo =

Church in Aguadilla, Puerto Rico

San Carlos Borromeo Church
- San Carlos Borromeo and Santísima Virgen de la Victoria Parish Church
- Iglesia de San Carlos Borromeo
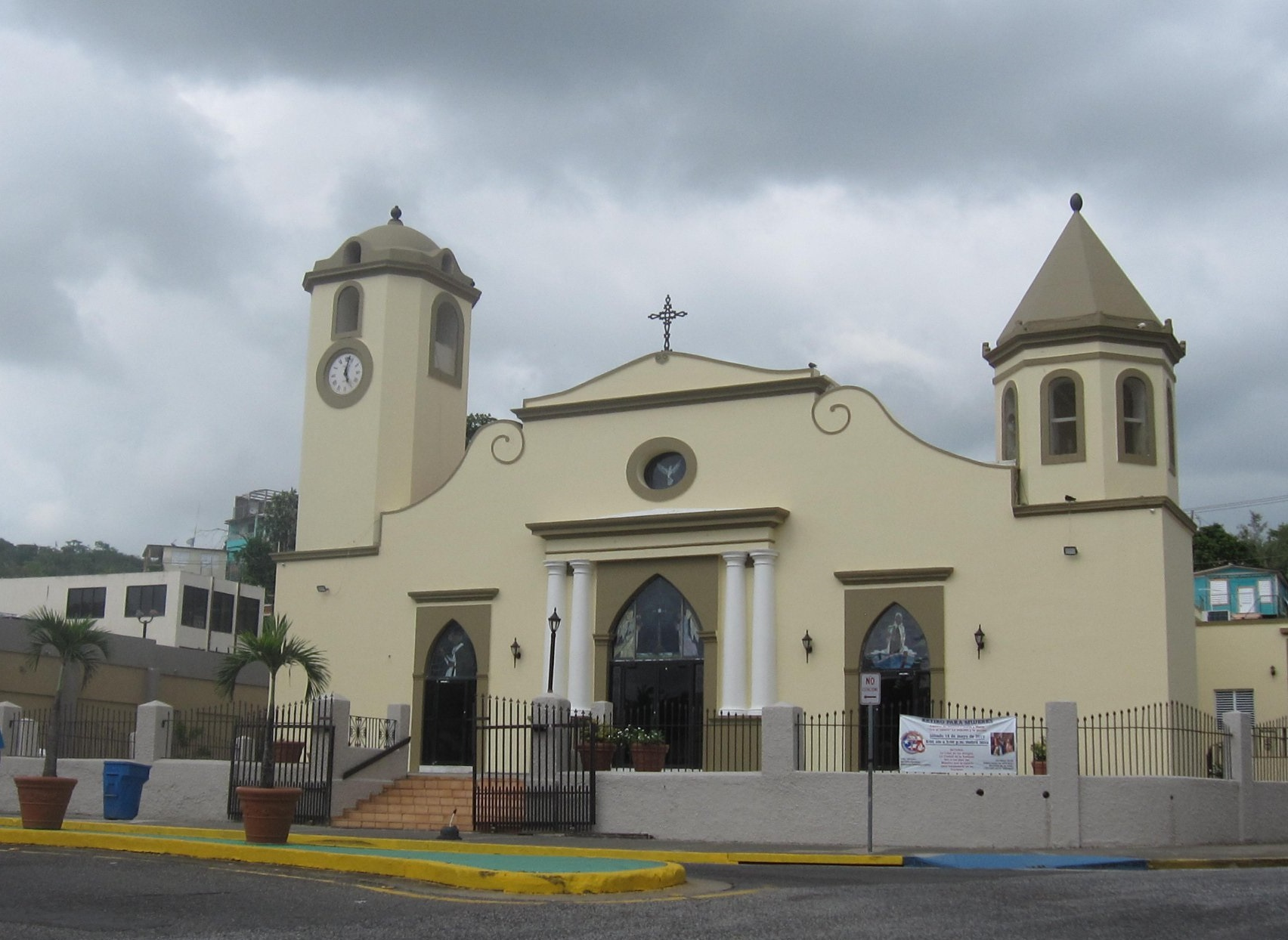
- San Carlos Borromeo Church in 2019

- Location in Puerto Rico
- 18°25′47″N 67°09′13″W
- Location: Aguadilla Pueblo, Aguadilla, Puerto Rico
- Address: José de Diego Street, Town Plaza; Aguadilla, Puerto Rico
- Country: Puerto Rico
- Denomination: Roman Catholic Church
- Website: diocesisdemayaguez.org/parroquia-san-carlos-borromeo

History
- Status: Parish church
- Founded: 1780
- Dedication: Saint Charles Borromeo
- Consecrated: March 21, 1780

Architecture
- Heritage designation: Puerto Rico Register of Historic Sites and Zones
- Designated: December 21, 2000
- Architect: Pedro Cobreros (1887 renovation)
- Architectural type: Classical Revival
- Years built: 1783, 1862, 1874, 1887, 1918
- Groundbreaking: 1780
- Completed: 1918

Administration
- Diocese: Mayagüez
- Church San Carlos Borromeo of Aguadilla
- U.S. National Register of Historic Places
- Built: 1783
- MPS: Historic Churches of Puerto Rico MPS
- NRHP reference No.: 84003124
- Added to NRHP: September 18, 1984

Iglesia de San Carlos Borromeo (English: Church of Saint Charles Borromeo) is a historic church built in 1783, located on the main plaza of Aguadilla, Puerto Rico. It was listed on the U.S. National Register of Historic Places in 1984, and on the Puerto Rico Register of Historic Sites and Zones in 2000.

It is one of five churches with architecture designed by State Architect Pedro Cobreros.

== Description ==
The parish, founded on March 21, 1780, was dedicated to both Our Lady of Victory and Saint Charles Borromeo to honor the then Spanish monarch Charles III of Spain. The original church was built in 1783. An octagonal tower at the north was added in 1862, and another to the south in 1874. The facade was revised in 1887 according to plans designed by Pedro Cobreros. After the 1918 San Fermín earthquake the south tower was rebuilt, lower than before, and the facade was somewhat changed. The church was last remodeled in 1971.

The church includes two aisles, and a nave covered with a flat roof. It is reportedly the only church in Puerto Rico with an apse covered by a groin vault rather than a dome or a barrel vault.

It is one of 31 Puerto Rican churches reviewed for listing on the National Register in 1984 as part of the Historic Churches of Puerto Rico multiple property submission (MPS).

== Gallery ==
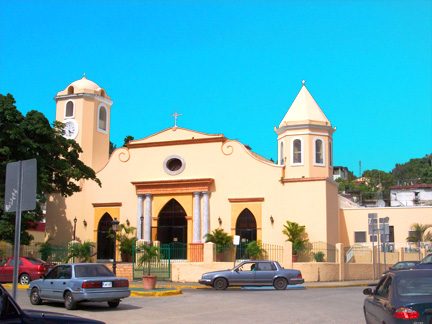
The church in 2006

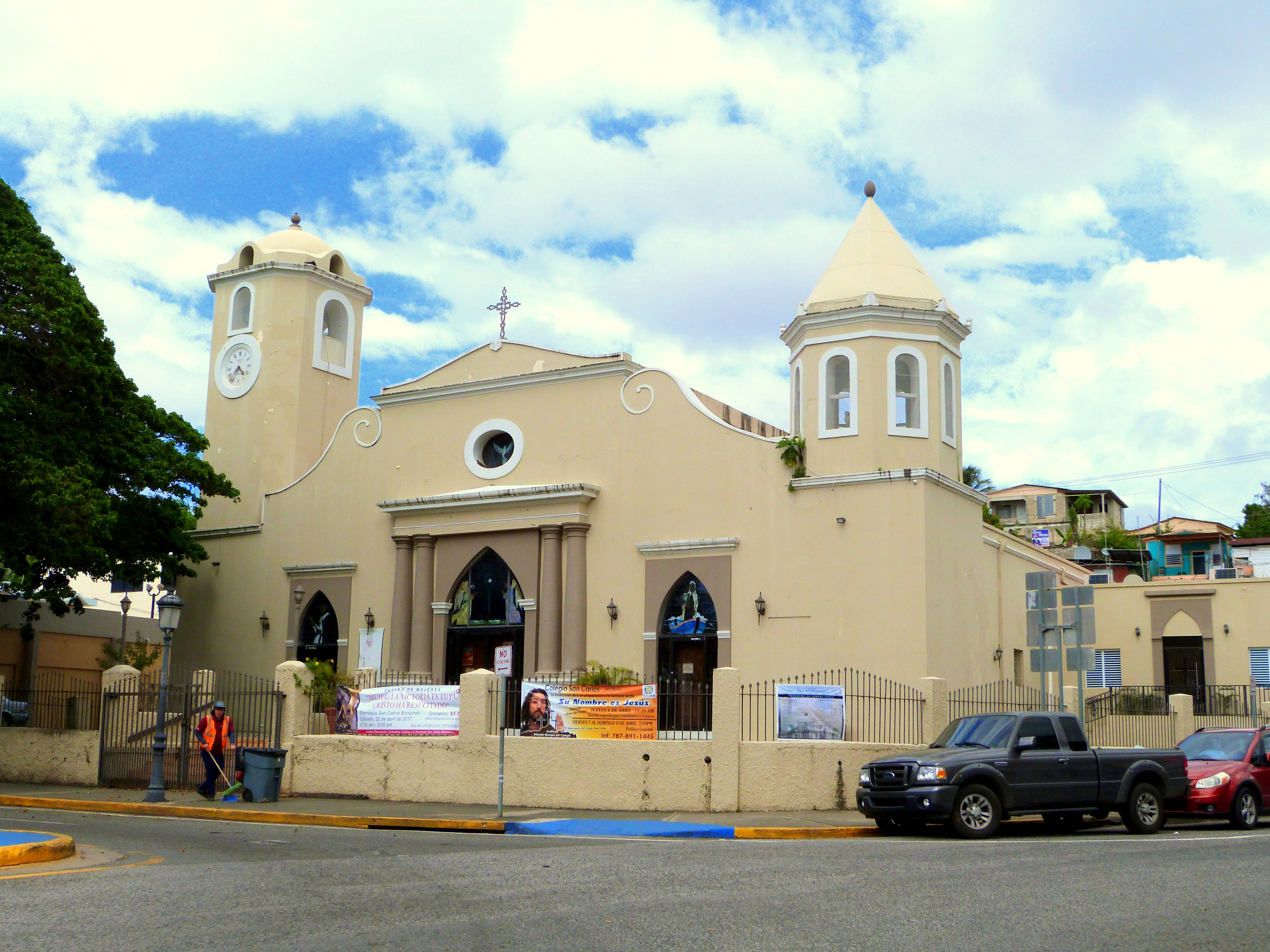
The church in 2017

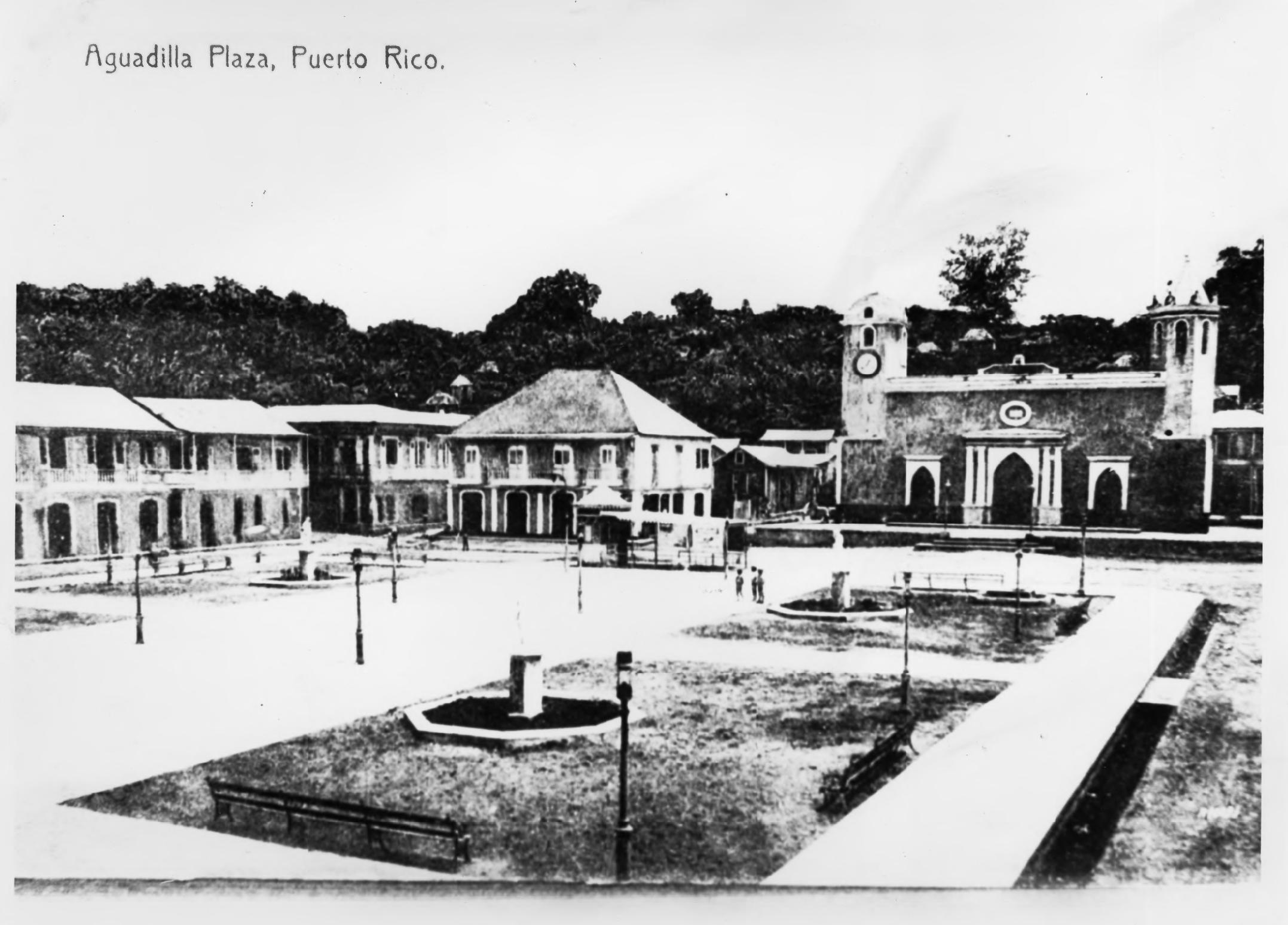
The Aguadilla town plaza c. 1910, with the church in the rear at right

== See also ==
- National Register of Historic Places listings in western Puerto Rico
