= Corregimiento Plaza Theater =

- U.S. National Register of Historic Places
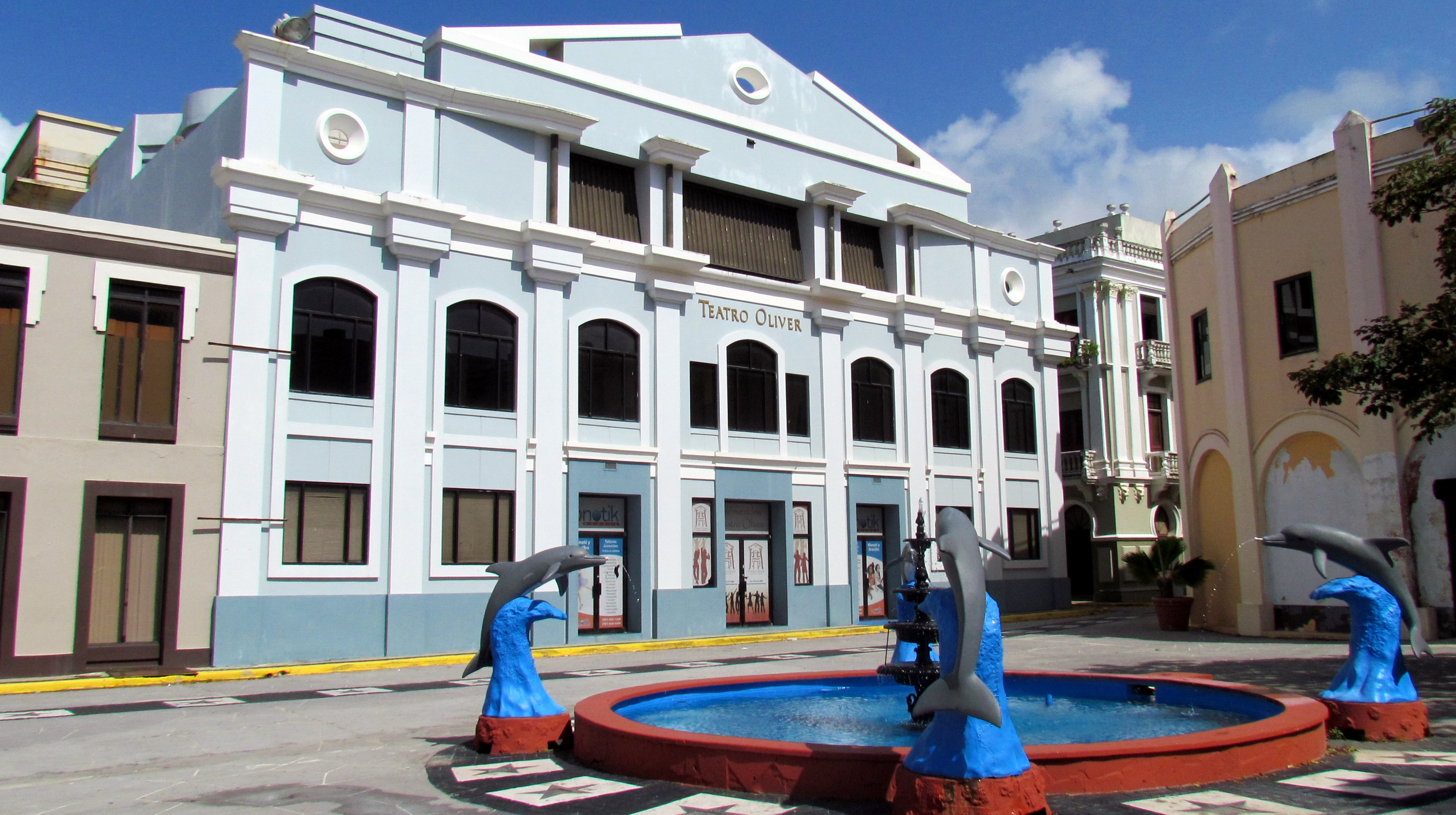

- Location within Puerto Rico
- Location: Llaguerry and Toribio Pagan Sts., Arecibo, Puerto Rico
- Coordinates: 18°28′22″N 66°42′55″W
- Built: 1876, 1919, 1930s
- Architectural style: Classical Revival
- NRHP reference No.: 86000041
- Added to NRHP: January 6, 1986

The Corregimiento Plaza Theater in Arecibo, Puerto Rico was built in 1876 as a three-story brick Classical Revival theater building known as Teatro Oliver or the Oliver Theater. It was listed on the National Register of Historic Places on January 6, 1986. It was built with a mechanism that could raise and lower the orchestra floor so that the space could be used for different purposes. It was remodelled in 1919 after a series of earthquakes (presumably including the 1918 San Fermin earthquake) damaged it, and it was remodelled again in the 1930s. The floor moving mechanism was then removed, the stage was shortened, and balconies were replaced by a new mezzanine. In 1955 it became exclusively a movie house, with a cinemascope screen. It operated as a movie house until 1984 when it was closed.
