= Casa de Piedra (Aguadilla, Puerto Rico) =

- Casa de Piedra, also known as Residencia Amparo Roldán
- U.S. National Register of Historic Places
- Puerto Rico Historic Sites and Zones
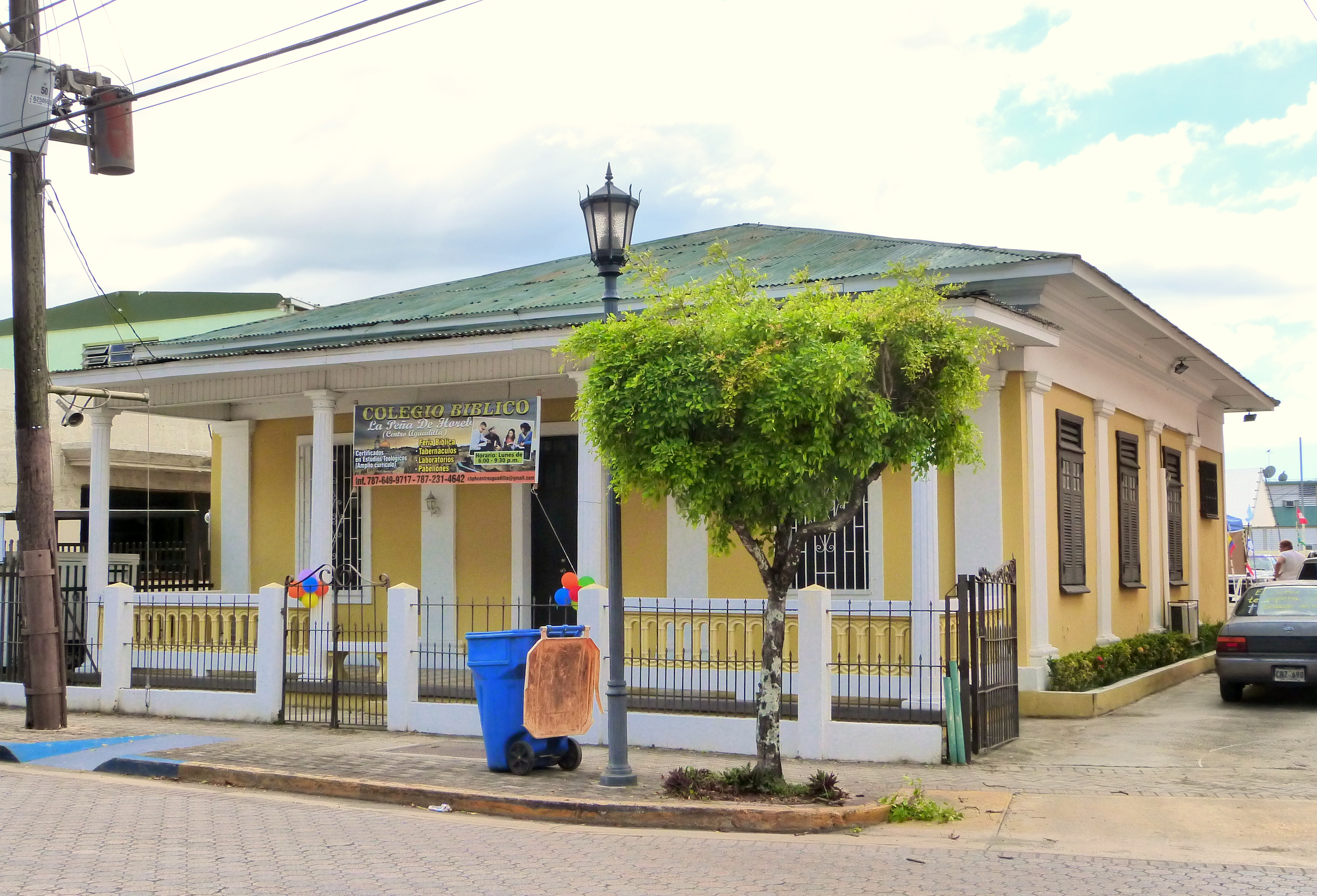
- The Casa de Piedra in 2017

- Location within Puerto Rico
- Location: 14 Progresso St., Aguadilla, Puerto Rico
- Coordinates: 18°25′22″N 67°8′48″W
- Built: 1875
- Architect: Balbuquet, Bernardo
- Architectural style: Spanish Colonial
- NRHP reference No.: 86000704
- RNSZH No.: 2000-(RO)-19-JP-SH

Significant dates
- Added to NRHP: April 3, 1986
- Designated RNSZH: December 21, 2000

Casa de Piedra, also known as Residencia Amparo Roldán, in Aguadilla, Puerto Rico, is a Spanish Colonial-style home that was erected in 1875. It is the only surviving residence of its era in Aguadilla; most similar ones were damaged in the 1918 San Fermín earthquake and eventually demolished.

It was listed on the National Register of Historic Places of Puerto Rico in 1986 and on the Puerto Rico Register of Historic Sites and Zones in 2000.

It was built on stone foundations of an even older building that has been suggested to be the home of Ponce de Leon.
