= Duey =

Duey may refer to:

People

- Duey Stroebel, American Republican politician and businessman from Wisconsin
- Henry Duey (1908–1993), American weightlifter and Olympic medalist

Geography

- Duey and Julia Wright House, Frank Lloyd Wright designed Usonian home constructed in Wausau, Wisconsin in 1959
- Duey River (San Germán, Puerto Rico), river of Puerto Rico
- Duey River (Yauco, Puerto Rico), river of Puerto Rico
- Duey Alto, San Germán, Puerto Rico, a barrio in Puerto Rico
- Duey Bajo, San Germán, Puerto Rico, a barrio in Puerto Rico
- Duey, Yauco, Puerto Rico, a barrio in Puerto Rico

== See also ==
- Dewey (disambiguation)
