= Marcantoni =

Marcantoni is a surname. Notable people with the surname include:

- Benjamín Marcantoni, Puerto Rican opera singer, actor and composer
- François Marcantoni (1920–2010), Corsican gangster, member of French resistance, bank robber and writer
- Jonathan Marcantoni (born 1984), American novelist, screenwriter, and editor
