= Duey River =

Duey River may refer to:

- Duey River (San Germán, Puerto Rico)
- Duey River (Yauco, Puerto Rico)
