= Caín River =

River of Puerto Rico

Coordinates: 18.0952378°N 67.0407342°W

- Native name: Río Caín (Spanish)

Location
- Commonwealth: Puerto Rico
- Municipality: San Germán

Physical characteristics
- Source
  - location: Cerro Santa Ana in Caín Alto, San Germán
- Mouth
  - location: Guanajibo River in Caín Bajo, San Germán
  - elevation: 118 ft.

Basin features
- Waterfalls: El Pilón Falls

The Caín River (Spanish: Río Caín) is a tributary of the Guanajibo River that flows through the municipality of San Germán, Puerto Rico. The Caín has its source in the south face of the Cerro Santa Ana, also known as Monte del Estado, within the Maricao State Forest. The river is one of many that form part of the hydrological region of the Maricao rainforest ecosystem. Charco El Pilón is a popular plunge pool created by a waterfall of the same name in barrio Caín Alto within the state forest.
