= Colegio San José (San Germán) =

Former preparatory school in San Germán, Puerto Rico

Location
- On the corner of Victoria and Estrella streets San Germán 00683; Puerto Rico; 18.083849°N 67.045805°W

Information
- Type: Private, Coeducational
- Religious affiliation: Roman Catholic
- Patron saint: St. Joseph
- Established: 1930
- Founder: Rev. Father Jesús Fernández, O.S.A. and Sisters Rosita María, María Reparatrice, Rose Verónica and Grace Edna of the Order of St. Joseph
- Closed: 30 June 2017
- School board: Junta Administrativa
- Authority: Diocese of Mayagüez
- CEEB code: 2970
- Principal: Carla María González-Cobos
- Grades: PK–12
- Enrollment: Approx. 200 (2013)
  - Grade 9: 24
  - Grade 10: 14
  - Grade 11: 8
  - Grade 12: 24
- Colors: Blue and Yellow
- Sports: Soccer, Basketball, Volleyball
- Nickname: El monarca de las lomas
- Team name: Warriors
- Accreditation: General Council of Education of Puerto Rico
- Newspaper: Ecos (defunct)

The Colegio San José was a private, co-educational, Roman Catholic college preparatory school located in the city of San Germán, Puerto Rico.

== History ==
The school in its present form was founded in 1930 by the Sisters of St. Joseph ("hermanas Josefinas" in Spanish) who came to San Germán from Brentwood, New York, originally as an all-girls school. However, The Sisters of Charity were the first in opening a school in the structure- they established the Colegio para Señoritas de la Inmaculada Concepción, an all-girls school that functioned from 1913 to 1927. The Sisters of St. Joseph were responsible for running all aspects of the school until their departure in 2007. Since then, the school was directed by a principal, an administrative director, and a board of regents appointed by the bishop of Mayagüez. The Convent is no longer inhabited by any religious orders.

On November 20, 2013 the contract for the creation of the Alliance for Catholic Education (Alianza Pro Educación Católica) was signed on a formal activity within the school itself. The Alliance is a joint venture between the Pontifical Catholic University of Puerto Rico, The Apostolic Movement of Schoenstatt, and the Colegio for the reinforcement of spiritual, academic, social, and moral values for the renovation of the school. This new school policy was denominated: "La nueva primavera", which literally translates as "The New Spring".

Before its use as a school, the older buildings were home to missionaries from 1878 to 1898 and served as a convent for The Order of the Brothers of Our Lady of Mount Carmel (i.e., Carmelites) from 1903 to 1913.

== Facilities ==
Colegio San José is located on top of the highest hill of the historical city of San Germán, the "Loma de Santa Clara" (the Hill of St. Clare).

As you approach Colegio San José on the corner of Estrella and Victoria streets, three divisions are clearly visible in the south façade: the former Hermitage of St. Sebastian at the center, the old Carmelite Convent to its right, and a new building which houses the primary grades (K-3rd grade) of the school to the left. The latter was built following the architectural design of the old convent so as to not detract from the historical value of the building. In front of the old structure stands the statue of St. Joseph, patron saint of the school.

The Hermitage of St. Sebastian was built in 1737, and served as the city’s parish church at times when the official parish church of San Germán de Auxerre was unavailable for worship. The Hermitage’s original altar now stands in the church of Porta Coeli, also in San Germán, one of the oldest churches in the Western Hemisphere. Presently, the Hermitage of St. Sebastian functions as the school's library.

In 1878 the Convent now located to the right of the old Hermitage (if seen from the south) was added on to serve as a seminary, but this was never so. Before the Sisters of Joseph arrived, the buildings were inhabited by a number of religious orders, including Franciscan friars, Redemptionist priests, Augustine friars, Carmelites, and Sisters of Charity. The Convent housed the Sisters of St. Joseph from 1930 to 2007 and it is now vacant. A number of administrative offices and meeting halls are located in the Convent, and it serves as the primary entrance from the historical façade on the south side of campus and provides access to the Hermitage and library.

Three buildings were added to the north of the south façade buildings to create a quadrangle that is the heart of the school. The eastern building houses grades 4 through 6 and an auditorium, the northern building houses the high school (grades 9 through 12) and the western building houses a stage and a small cafeteria (San José Café). The second floor of the western building houses the office of the principal and administrative personnel. Junior high school students (grades 7 and 8) take classes in a set of buildings annexed to the northern side of the Convent, which also includes a chapel and, formerly, the offices for the school newspaper, the Ecos, which ceased publication around 2012. Main access to the school is provided through a gate between the eastern and northern buildings.

To the northeast of the main campus, two more buildings complete the school. Both lie about 200 feet below the other buildings and are accessed by stairs to the east and north. To the east, what once was a four-story house is home to the art and music departments, as well as the pre-kindergarten classrooms. To the north is a multi-purpose building that includes a parking garage on its first level and an indoor basketball and volleyball court, a large stage with wings for dramatic and musical performances as well as a space for school-wide activities such as graduations and talent shows on the second floor.

== Academics ==
The school offers pre-school, preparatory, secondary, and high school education in the same campus. All-year programs provide basic education and additionally for senior class students, electives; sports (including soccer, basketball, volleyball, gymnastics), and art classes (such as music and art). It runs from Pre-kindergarten to 12th grade and includes subjects like: English, Math, Spanish, Religion, Social Studies, Art and Music for the elementary level, and: Government, Psychology, French, Sociology, Economy, World History, Physics, Advanced Mathematics and others for the high school students.

As the school is a private catholic institution, it falls under the jurisdiction of the Superintendency of Catholic Schools of the Diocese of Mayagüez (represented by a board appointed by the bishop) and is governed by a school administration headed by a principal (currently Dr. Carla María González-Cobos). On November 20, 2013 the contract for the creation of the Alliance for Catholic Education (Alianza Pro Educación Católica) was signed on a formal activity within the school itself. The Alliance is a joint venture between the Pontifical Catholic University of Puerto Rico, The Apostolic Movement of Schoenstatt, and the Colegio for the reinforcement of spiritual, academic, social and moral values for the renovation of the school. This new school policy has been denominated: "La nueva primavera", which literally translates as "The New Spring".
