= Cotuí, San Germán, Puerto Rico =

Barrio of Puerto Rico

Cotuí
- Barrio
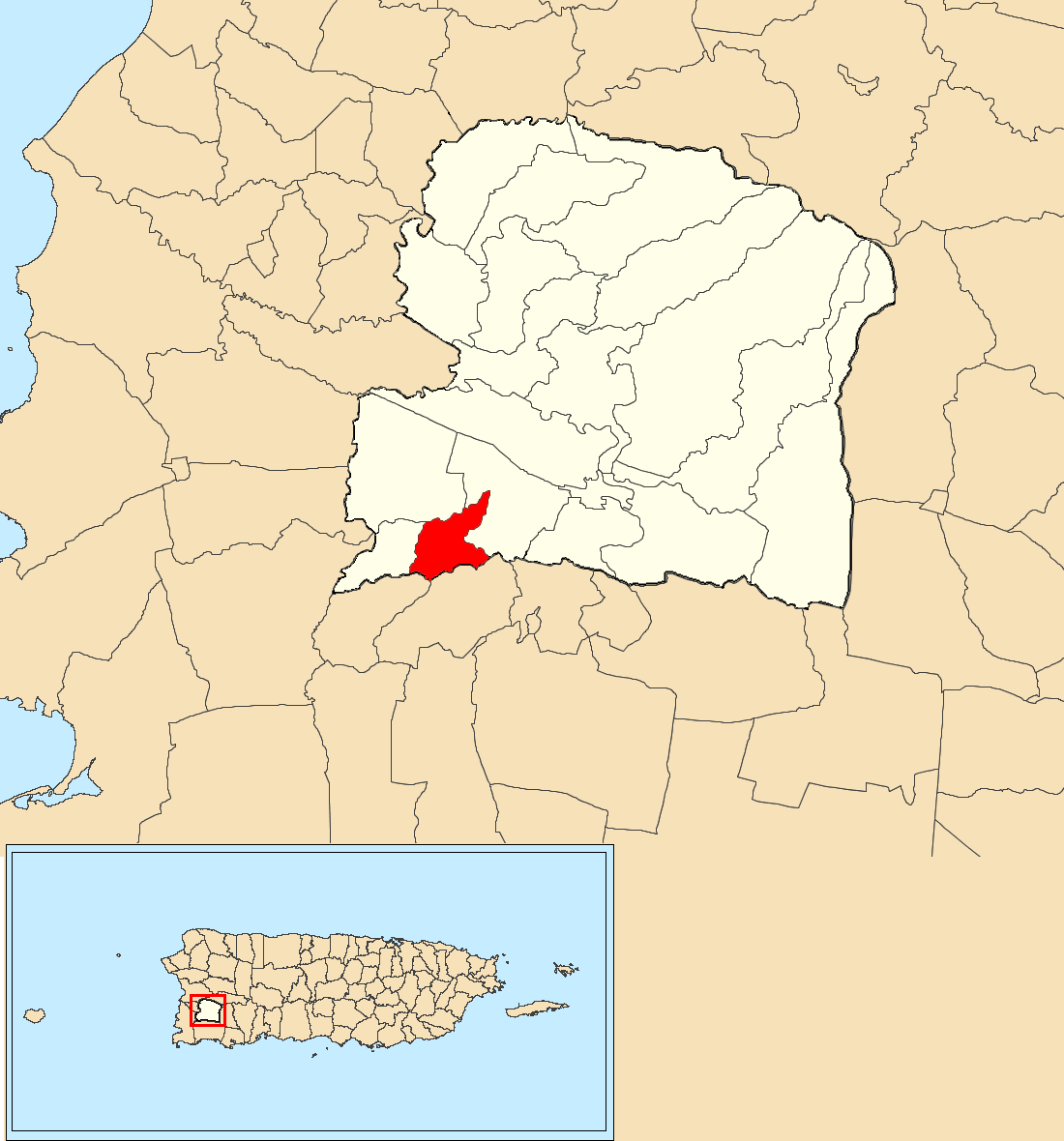
- Location of Cotuí within the municipality of San Germán shown in red

- Location of Puerto Rico
- Coordinates: 18°04′04″N 67°04′41″W
- Commonwealth: Puerto Rico
- Municipality: San Germán

Area
  - Total: 1.01 sq mi (2.6 km^{2})
  - Land: 1.01 sq mi (2.6 km^{2})
  - Water: 0 sq mi (0 km^{2})
- Elevation: 620 ft (190 m)

Population (2010)
  - Total: 749
  - Density: 749/sq mi (289/km^{2})
- Source: 2010 Census
- Time zone: UTC−4 (AST)

Cotuí is a barrio in the municipality of San Germán, Puerto Rico. Its population in 2010 was 749.

== History ==
Cotuí was in Spain's gazetteers until Puerto Rico was ceded by Spain in the aftermath of the Spanish–American War under the terms of the Treaty of Paris of 1898 and became an unincorporated territory of the United States. In 1899, the United States Department of War conducted a census of Puerto Rico finding that the population of Cotuí barrio was 811.

Historical population
Census	Pop.	Note	%±
1900	811		—
1910	952		17.4%
1920	1,102		15.8%
1930	952		−13.6%
1940	1,126		18.3%
1950	867		−23.0%
1960	643		−25.8%
1970	634		−1.4%
1980	758		19.6%
1990	592		−21.9%
2000	751		26.9%
2010	749		−0.3%
U.S. Decennial Census; 1899 (shown as 1900) 1910-1930; 1930-1950 1980-2000 2010

== See also ==
- List of communities in Puerto Rico
