= Rosario Alto =

Barrio of San Germán, Puerto Rico

- Barrio
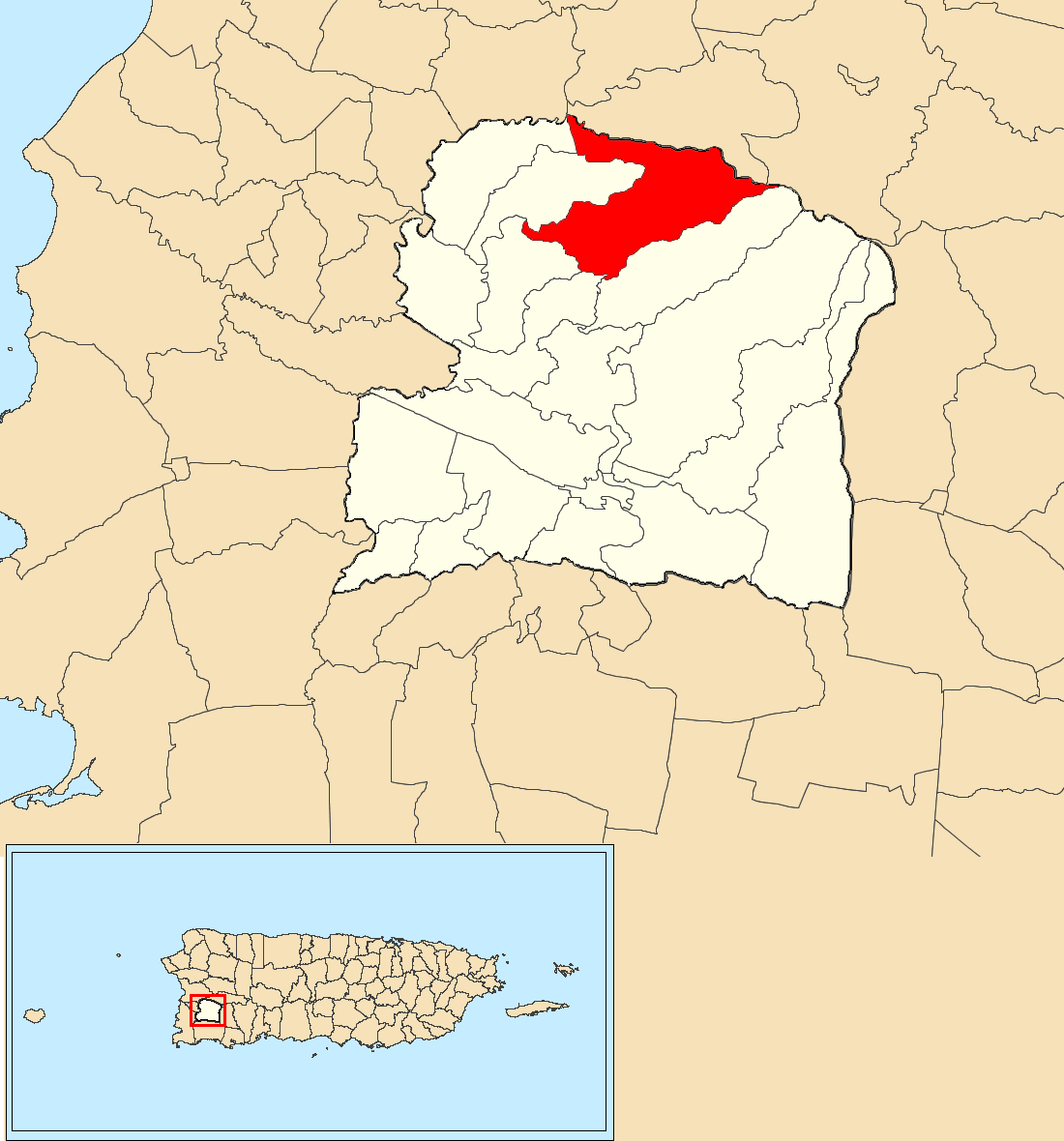
- Location of Rosario Alto within the municipality of San Germán shown in red

- Location of Puerto Rico
- Coordinates: 18°09′11″N 67°01′56″W
- Commonwealth: Puerto Rico
- Municipality: San Germán

Area
  - Total: 4.34 sq mi (11.2 km^{2})
  - Land: 4.34 sq mi (11.2 km^{2})
  - Water: 0 sq mi (0 km^{2})
- Elevation: 1,414 ft (431 m)

Population (2010)
  - Total: 721
  - Density: 166.1/sq mi (64.1/km^{2})
- Source: 2010 Census
- Time zone: UTC−4 (AST)

Rosario Alto is a barrio in the municipality of San Germán, Puerto Rico. Its population in 2010 was 721.

== History ==
Rosario Alto was in Spain's gazetteers until Puerto Rico was ceded by Spain in the aftermath of the Spanish–American War under the terms of the Treaty of Paris of 1898 and became an unincorporated territory of the United States. In 1899, the United States Department of War conducted a census of Puerto Rico finding that the population of Rosario Alto barrio was 811.

Historical population
Census	Pop.	Note	%±
1900	811		—
1910	729		−10.1%
1920	828		13.6%
1930	682		−17.6%
1940	772		13.2%
1950	769		−0.4%
1960	603		−21.6%
1970	636		5.5%
1980	698		9.7%
1990	578		−17.2%
2000	761		31.7%
2010	721		−5.3%
2020	730		1.2%
U.S. Decennial Census; 1899 (shown as 1900) 1910-1930; 1930-1950 1980-2000 2010

== See also ==
- List of communities in Puerto Rico
