= San Germán, Puerto Rico =

Town and municipality in Puerto Rico

San Germán Municipio Antónomo de San Germán
- Municipality
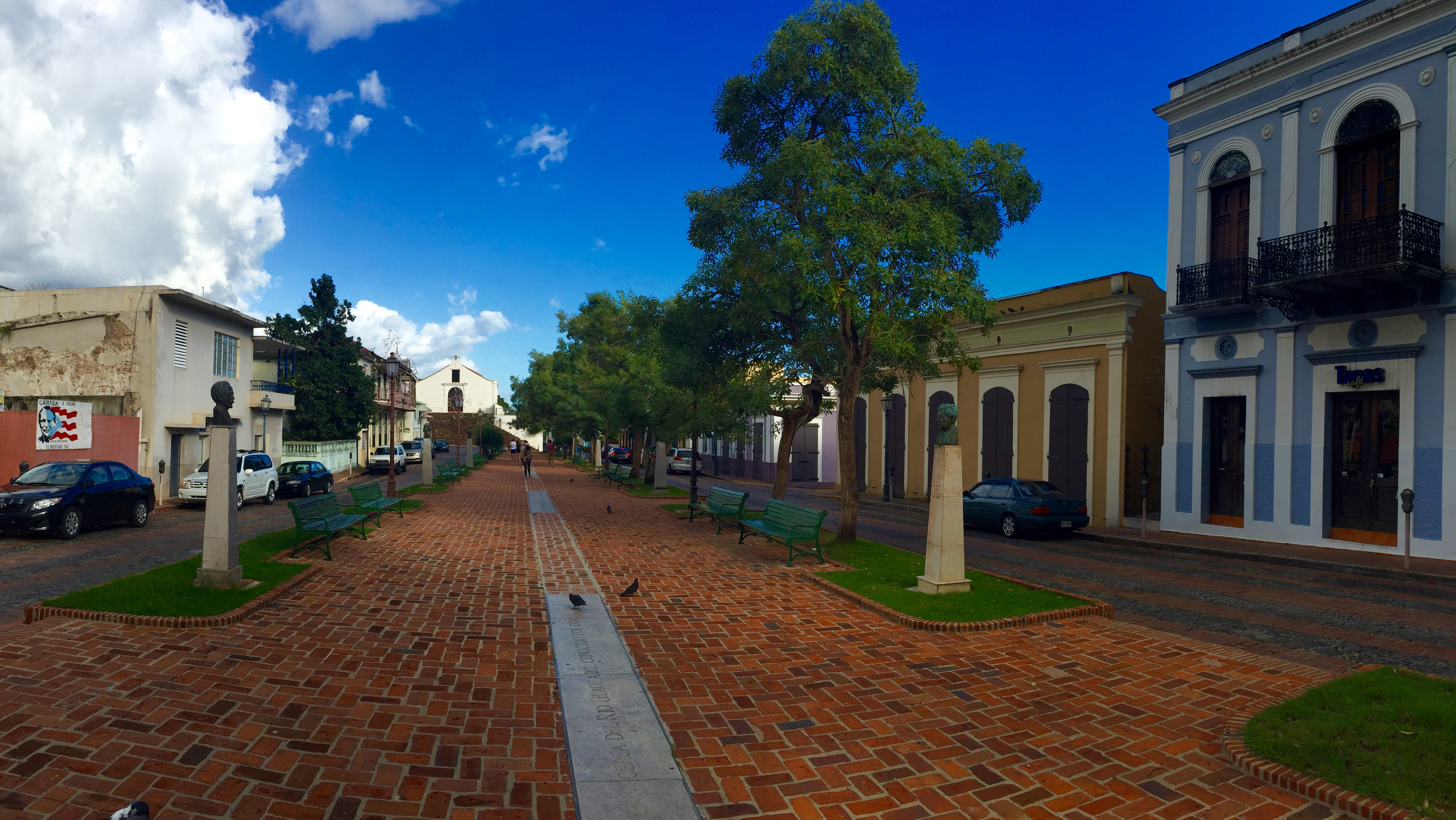
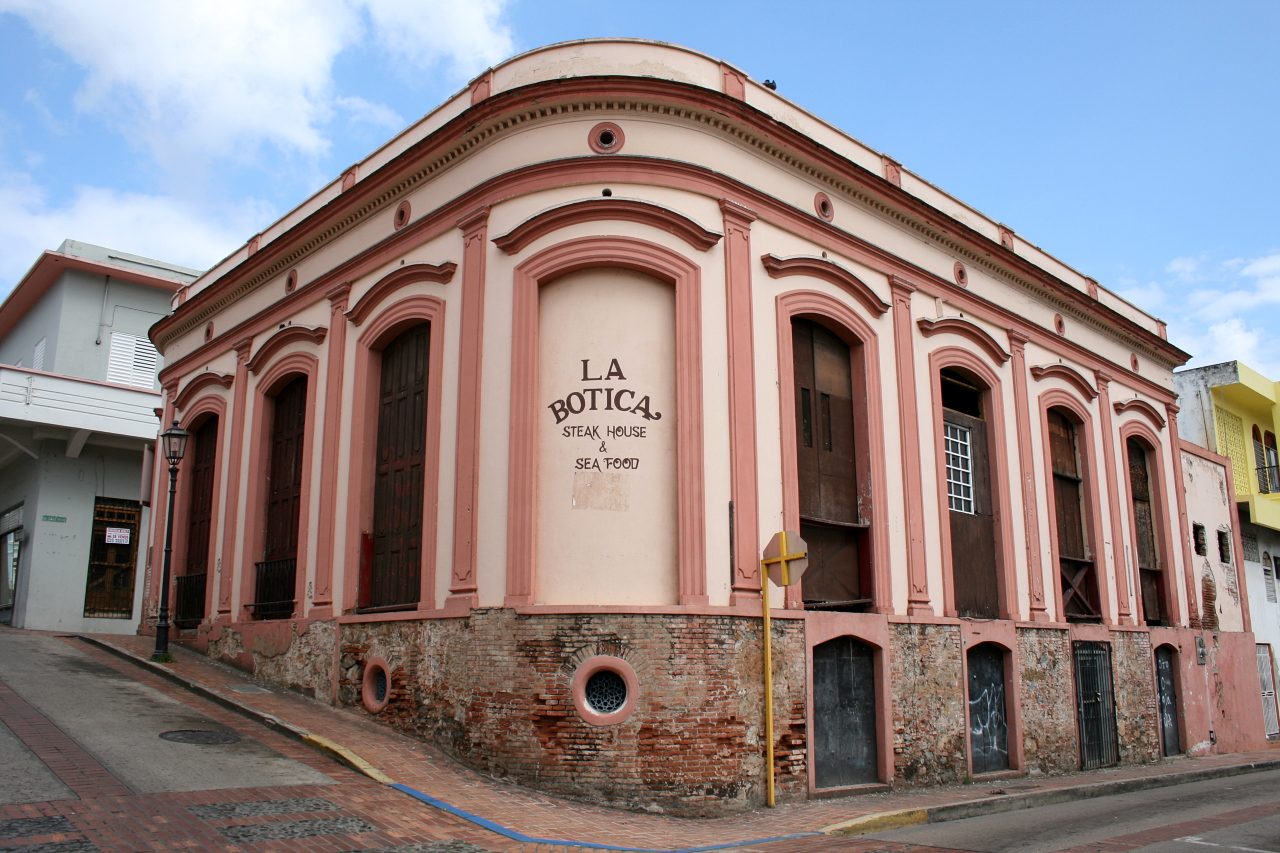
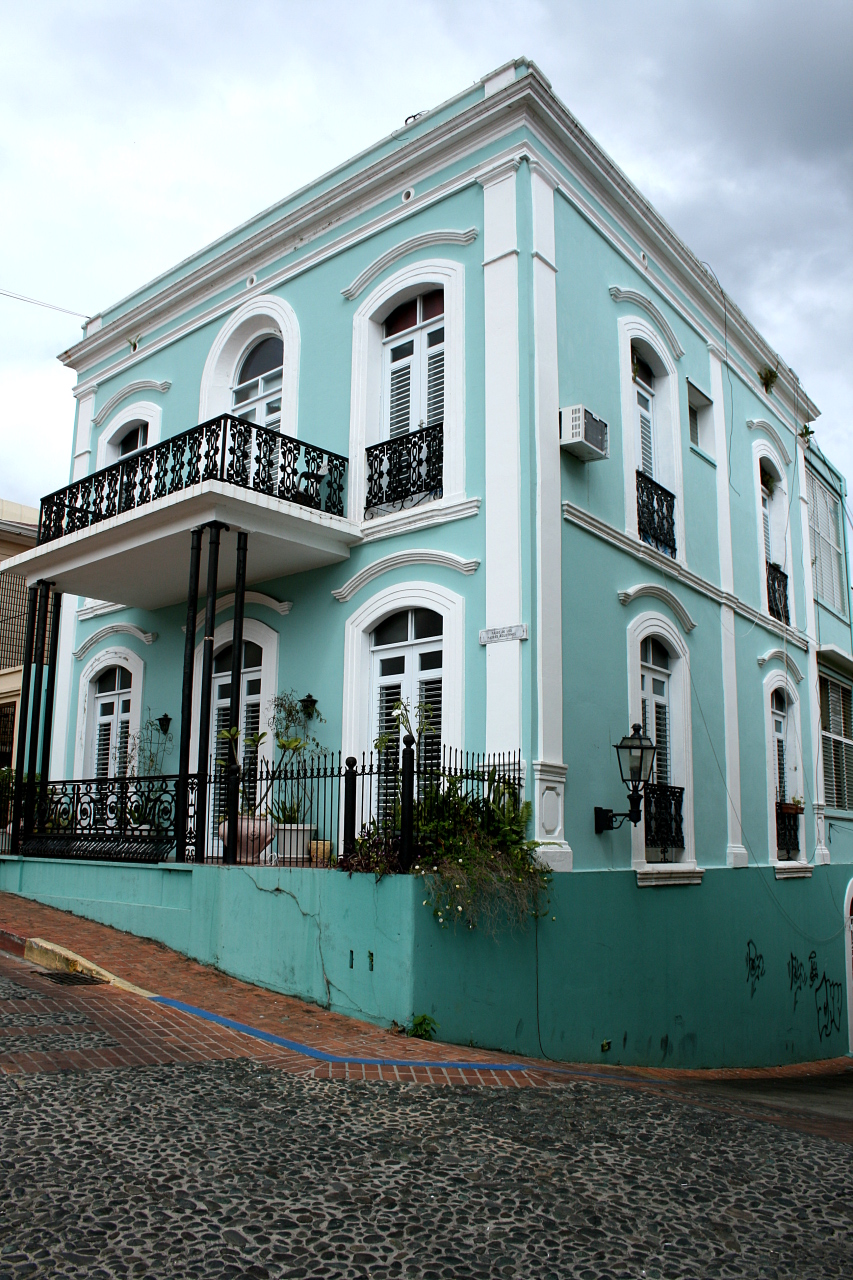
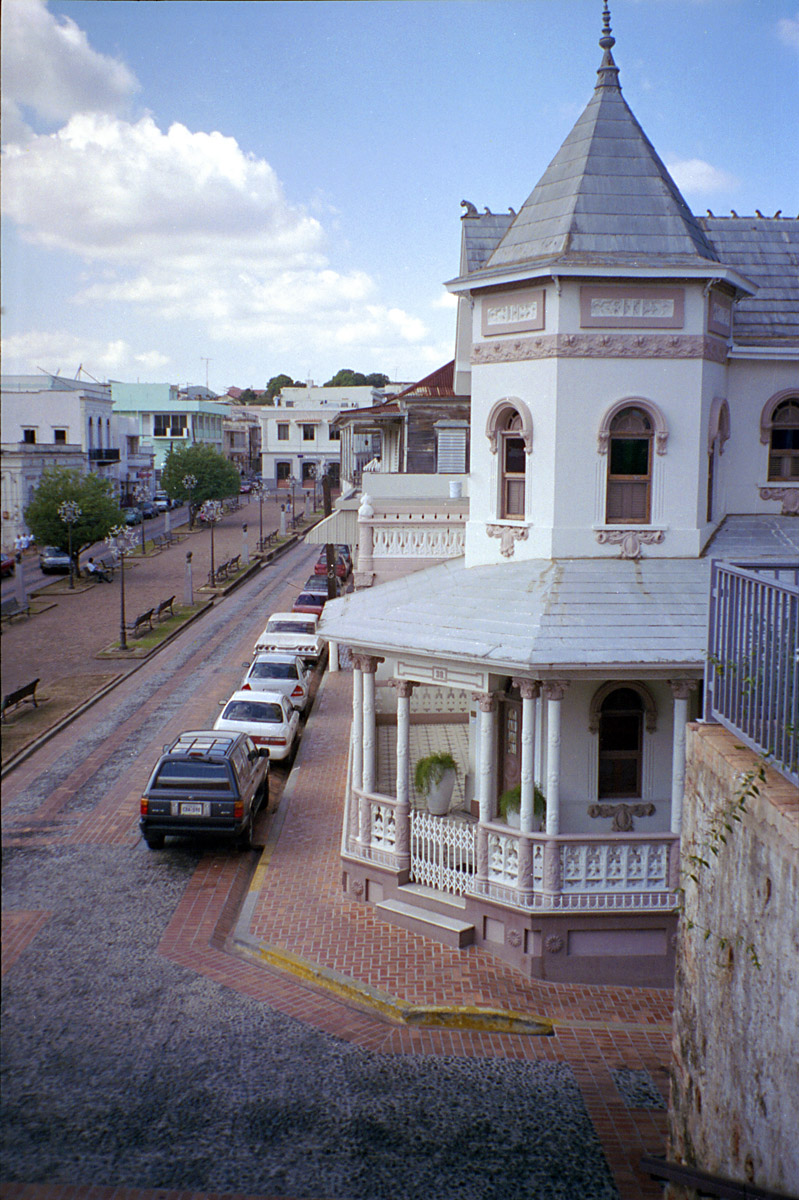
- San Germán Historic District with Porta Coeli and historic buildings in San Germán Pueblo

- Flag Coat of arms
- Nicknames: "La Ciudad de las Lomas", "Ciudad de las Golondrinas", "Ciudad Fundadora de Pueblos", "Ciudad Cuna del Baloncesto Puertorriqueño", "Ciudad Peregrina"
- Anthem: "San Germán es mi pueblo querido"
- Map of Puerto Rico highlighting San Germán Municipality
- Coordinates: 18°N 67°W
- Sovereign state: United States
- Commonwealth: Puerto Rico
- Settled: 1511; 1512 (on 2nd site)
- Founded: September 11, 1570
- Founder: Juan Ponce de León
- Named for: Germanus of Auxerre
- Barrios: 19 barrios: Ancones; Caín Alto; Caín Bajo; Cotuí; Duey Alto; Duey Bajo; Guamá; Hoconuco Alto; Hoconuco Bajo; Maresúa; Minillas; Retiro; Rosario Alto; Rosario Bajo; Rosario Peñón; Sabana Eneas; Sabana Grande Abajo; San Germán barrio-pueblo; Tuna

Government
  - Type: Mayor–council government
  - Mayor: Virgilio Olivera Olivera (PNP)
  - Senatorial dist.: Mayagüez
  - Representative dist.: 20

Area
  - Municipality: 54.51 sq mi (141.18 km^{2})
  - Land: 54.51 sq mi (141.18 km^{2})
  - Water: 0 sq mi (0 km^{2})
- Elevation: 528 ft (161 m)

Population (2020)
  - Municipality: 31,879
  - Estimate (2025): 30,809 ▼
  - Rank: 15th in Puerto Rico
  - Density: 584.83/sq mi (225.80/km^{2})
  - Metro: 136,212
  - CSA: 251,260
- Demonym: Sangermeños
- Time zone: UTC−4 (AST)
- ZIP Codes: 00683, 00636
- Area code: 787/939
- Major routes: link = Puerto Rico Highway 101 link = Puerto Rico Highway 102 link = Puerto Rico Highway 114 link = Puerto Rico Highway 120 link = Puerto Rico Highway 122 link = Puerto Rico Highway 166 link = Puerto Rico Highway 118 link = Puerto Rico Highway 119

San Germán (Spanish pronunciation: [saŋ xeɾˈman]) is a historic town and municipality located in the Sabana Grande Valley of southwestern region of Puerto Rico, south of Mayagüez and Maricao, north of Lajas, east of Hormigueros and Cabo Rojo, and west of Sabana Grande. San Germán is spread over eighteen barrios plus San Germán Pueblo (the downtown area and the administrative center of the city). It is both a principal city of the San Germán–Cabo Rojo Metropolitan Statistical Area and the Mayagüez–San Germán–Cabo Rojo Combined Statistical Area. San Germán is the second oldest city of Puerto Rico, after San Juan, and its historic downtown is preserved as the San Germán Historic District.

Puerto Rico was, at one time, divided administratively between the San Juan and the San Germán municipalities. The latter covered the western half of Puerto Rico and extended from the western shores of the island to Arecibo in the north and Ponce in the south.

== History ==
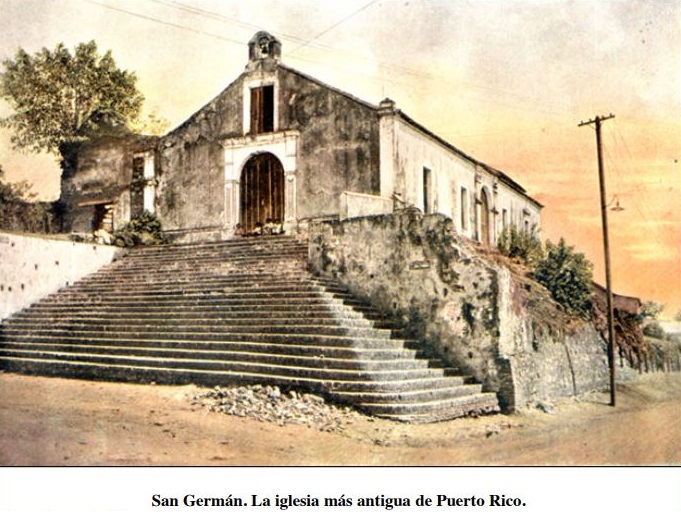
The Convent of Santo Domingo de Porta Coelio.

The population of San Germán when Alonso Manso was named the first bishop of Puerto Rico in 1511 was "about 50 residents". Outside of San Juan, Puerto Rico, San Germán was one of the largest settlements in the 16th century, as well as Coamo and Aguada.

Spanish settlement in San Germán occurred early in the conquest and colonization of Puerto Rico. After the destruction of a small early settlement of the same name near modern-day Añasco during a Taíno uprising which started in February 1511, in 1512 the new settlement was built by Miguel Díaz at Guayanilla and was named after Germaine of Foix, the second wife of King Fernando II, and in reference of Saint Germanus of Auxerre. This town was attacked by French corsairs in August 1528, May 1538 and 1554. The construction of a small fort began in 1540, but work stopped in 1546 when the population of the town began moving inland to the current modern location.

On May 12, 1571, the Royal Audience (Real Audiencia) of Santo Domingo authorized that both the populations of San Germán and Santa María de Guadianilla be merged into a single city due to the constant French attacks. The new city was built on the Hills of Santa Marta, next to the Guanajibo River in 1573. Its official name was Nueva Villa de Salamanca, named after the city of Salamanca in Spain. However, the population called the city San Germán el Nuevo (New San Germán) and, eventually, the Villa de San Germán (City of San Germán).

San Germán is also known as the "founder of towns", given the fact that in 1514 the Spanish Crown separated the island into two administrative territories (Partidos). The borders of the two partidos were established as the Camuy River to the north and the Jacagua River to the south. They were named the San Juan Partition and the San Germán Partition.

Hurricane Maria on September 20, 2017, triggered numerous landslides in San Germán with the significant amount of rainfall.

== Geography ==
San Germán is in the southwest region of the island. The town is located on the Sabana Grande valley which is bound by the Cordillera Central to the north and the Santa Marta Hills and the Lajas Valley to the south. Mountains in San Germán include Alto del Descanso (2,520 ft; 770 m) and Tetas de Cerro Gordo (2,897 ft; 883 m). San Germán has a number of rivers: Río Caín, Río Duey, Río Rosario, Río Guanajibo (Estero), Río Hoconuco, Guamá River and Rio El Brujo.

=== Barrios ===
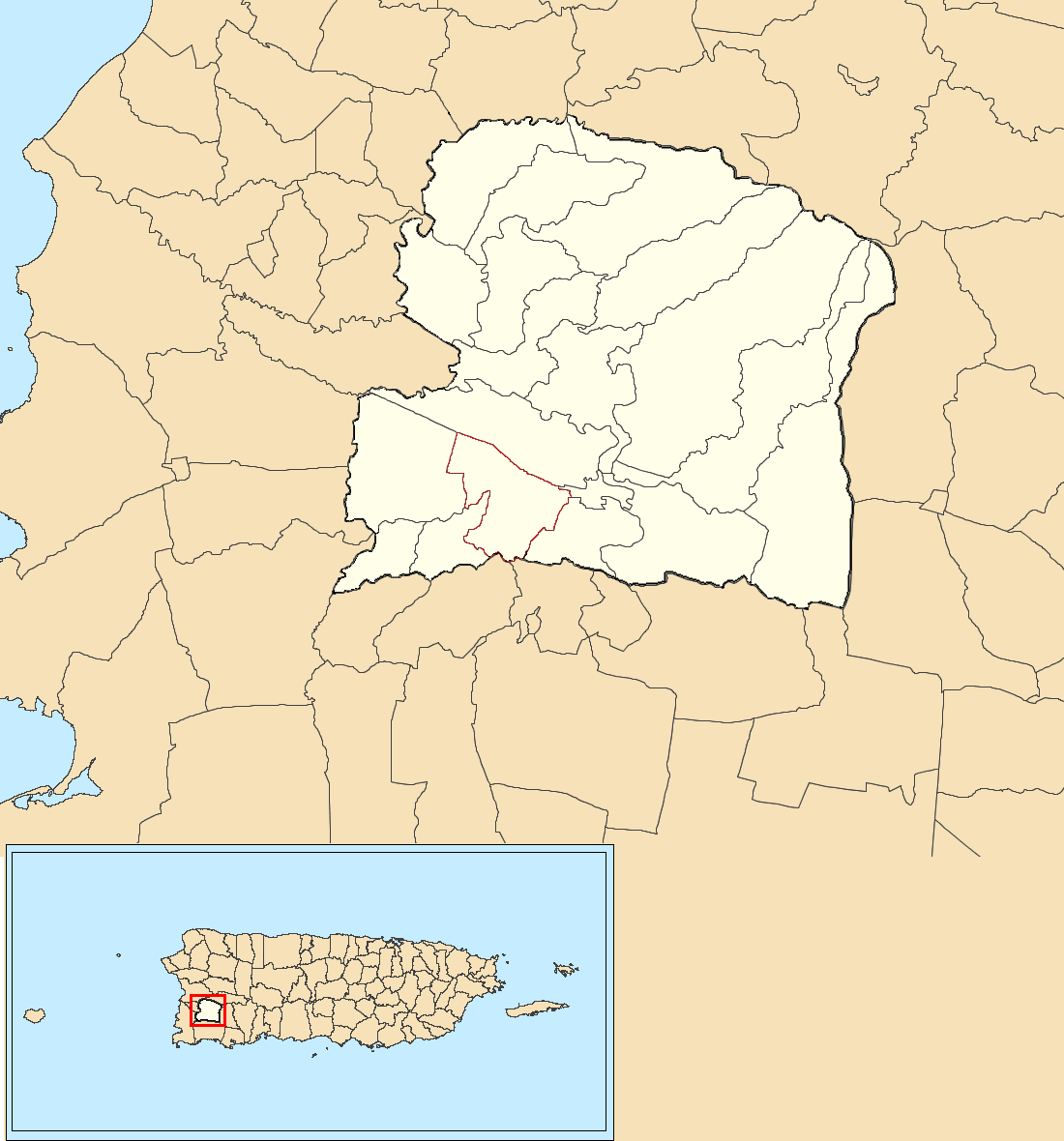
Subdivisions of San Germán.

Like all municipalities of Puerto Rico, San Germán is subdivided into barrios. The municipal buildings, central square and large Catholic church are located in a barrio referred to as "el pueblo".

1. Ancones
2. Caín Alto
3. Caín Bajo
4. Cotuí
5. Duey Alto
6. Duey Bajo
7. Guamá
8. Hoconuco Alto
9. Hoconuco Bajo
10. Maresúa
11. Minillas
12. Retiro
13. Rosario Alto
14. Rosario Bajo
15. Rosario Peñón
16. Sabana Eneas
17. Sabana Grande Abajo
18. San Germán barrio-pueblo
19. Tuna

=== Sectors ===
Barrios (which are, in contemporary times, roughly comparable to minor civil divisions) and subbarrios, are further subdivided into smaller areas called sectores (sectors in English). The types of sectores may vary, from normally sector to urbanización to reparto to barriada to residencial, among others.

=== Special Communities ===
Comunidades Especiales de Puerto Rico (Special Communities of Puerto Rico) are marginalized communities whose citizens are experiencing a certain amount of social exclusion. A map shows these communities occur in nearly every municipality of the commonwealth. Of the 742 places that were on the list in 2014, the following barrios, communities, sectors, or neighborhoods were in San Germán: Ancones, Comunidad El Retiro, Comunidad Las Quebradas, La Tea, Parcelas Las Carolinas, Parcelas Minillas en Barrio Minillas, Parcelas Sabana Eneas, and Rosario Peñón.

== Climate ==
Climate data for San Germán, Puerto Rico (1898-2013)
Month	Jan	Feb	Mar	Apr	May	Jun	Jul	Aug	Sep	Oct	Nov	Dec	Year
Record high °C (°F)	32.8 (91.0)	33.3 (91.9)	35 (95)	35 (95)	35 (95)	37.2 (99.0)	37.2 (99.0)	36.1 (97.0)	36.7 (98.1)	36.1 (97.0)	36.7 (98.1)	36.7 (98.1)	37.2 (99.0)
Mean daily maximum °C (°F)	30.6 (87.1)	30.6 (87.1)	31.1 (88.0)	31.7 (89.1)	32.2 (90.0)	32.8 (91.0)	33.3 (91.9)	33.3 (91.9)	32.8 (91.0)	32.2 (90.0)	31.7 (89.1)	31.1 (88.0)	32.0 (89.5)
Daily mean °C (°F)	23.9 (75.0)	23.9 (75.0)	24.4 (75.9)	25.6 (78.1)	26.7 (80.1)	27.2 (81.0)	27.2 (81.0)	27.2 (81.0)	27.2 (81.0)	26.7 (80.1)	25.6 (78.1)	24.4 (75.9)	25.8 (78.5)
Mean daily minimum °C (°F)	16.7 (62.1)	16.7 (62.1)	17.8 (64.0)	18.9 (66.0)	20.6 (69.1)	21.7 (71.1)	21.1 (70.0)	21.1 (70.0)	21.1 (70.0)	20.6 (69.1)	19.4 (66.9)	17.2 (63.0)	19.4 (67.0)
Record low °C (°F)	6.7 (44.1)	10.6 (51.1)	10.0 (50.0)	10.0 (50.0)	13.3 (55.9)	14.4 (57.9)	11.7 (53.1)	14.4 (57.9)	15.6 (60.1)	13.3 (55.9)	11.7 (53.1)	9.4 (48.9)	6.7 (44.1)
Average rainfall mm (inches)	63.8 (2.51)	55.6 (2.19)	55.6 (2.19)	87.1 (3.43)	130.6 (5.14)	68.6 (2.70)	79.5 (3.13)	132.8 (5.23)	157.5 (6.20)	185.2 (7.29)	145.0 (5.71)	59.2 (2.33)	1,220.5 (48.05)
Source: The Weather Channel

== Tourism ==
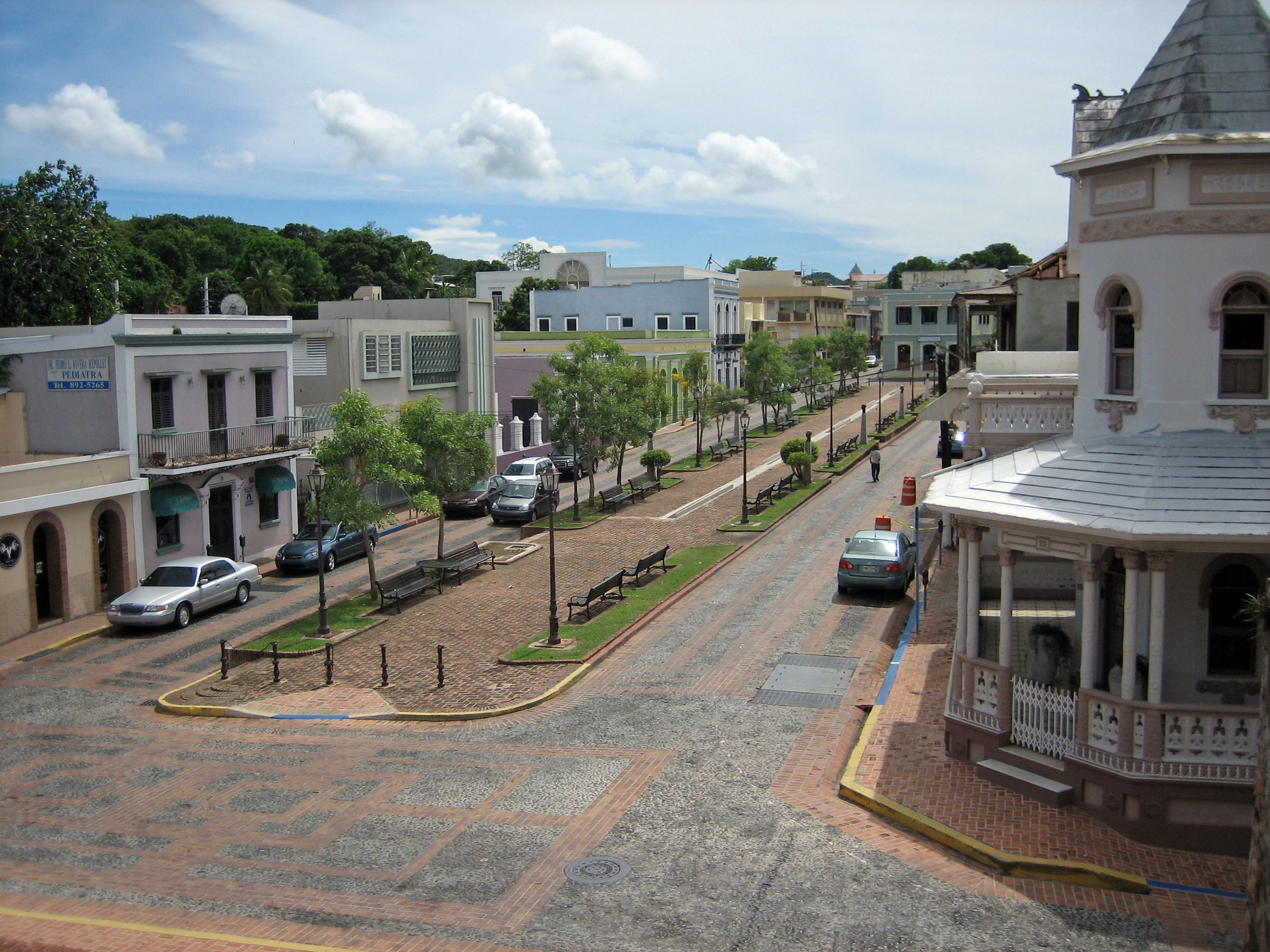
Plaza Santo Domingo, located in the San Germán Historic District

San Germán's historic downtown is the site of the Porta Coeli church, one of the earliest Spanish churches built in the Americas. Porta Coeli is still a major historical attraction that attracts both domestic and international tourists every year.

=== Landmarks and places of interest ===
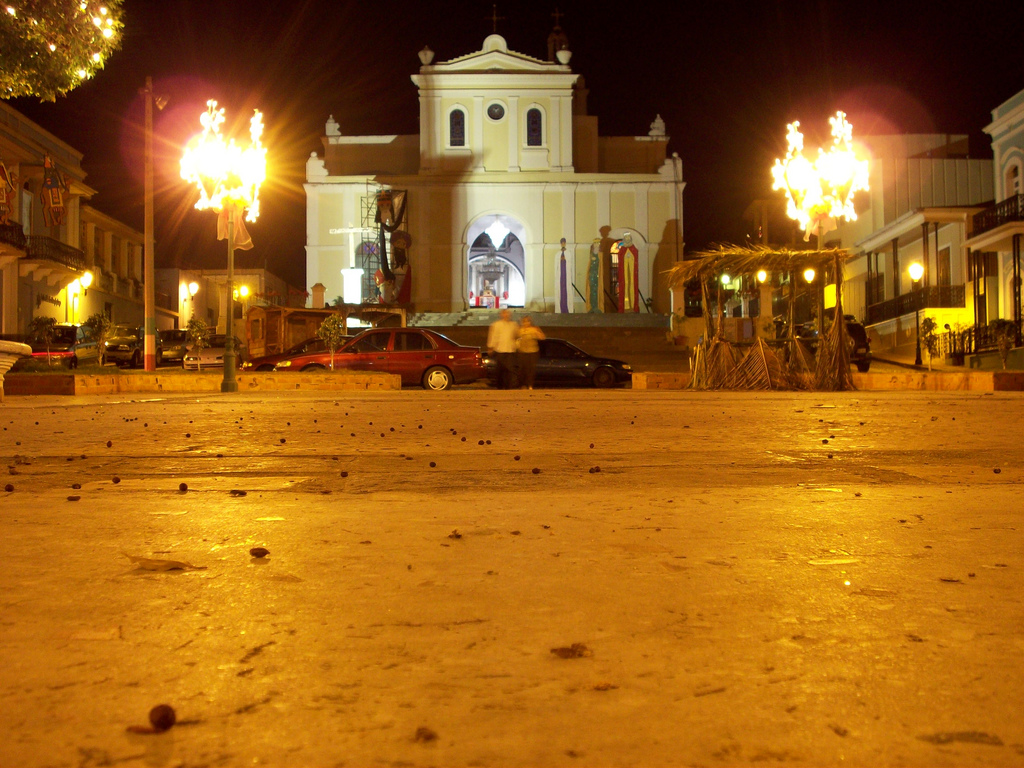
Plaza Francisco Mariano Quiñones and the Church San Germán de Auxerre

- Puente de Bolas (Bridge of Balls)
- Museo Farmacia La Botica
- Museo de la Historia de San Germán (San Germán history museum)
- Casa Morales
- Ceiba de la Libertad
- San Germán Historic Gallery
- Lola Rodríguez de Tió Museum
- Casa Cruz de la Luna
- Ramírez de Arrellano y Rossell Museum
- Santo Domingo Plazuela
- Three Races and One Culture Mural
- San Germán Historic District
- Porta Coeli
- Inter-American University of Puerto Rico
- Church San Germán de Auxerre
- Russian Orthodox Church Saint John Climacus (Only Russian Orthodox Church in Puerto Rico)

The urban center of San Germán is mainly composed of Spanish colonial houses. Many have been restored and conserve their Spanish look while other houses are somewhat abandoned and in poor condition. There are ongoing projects employing public and private funding to preserve and restore many houses and monuments and to maintain San Germán's colonial era look.

== Culture ==
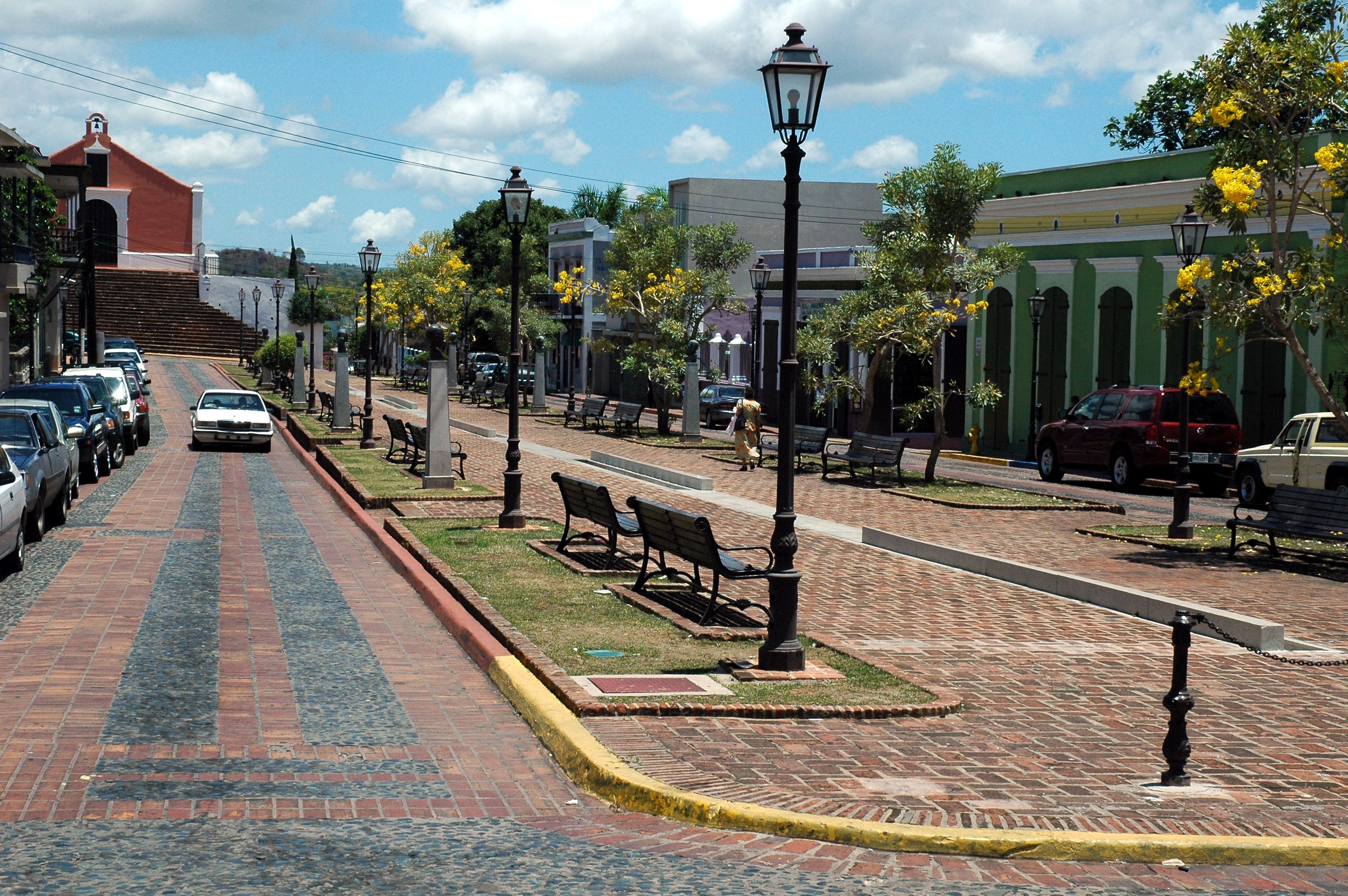
Plaza Santo Domingo

=== Festivals and events ===
San Germán celebrates its patron saint festival in late July / early August. The Fiestas Patronales de San German Euserre is a religious and cultural celebration that generally features parades, games, artisans, amusement rides, regional food, and live entertainment.

Other festivals and events celebrated in San Germán include:

- Festival de la Pana – July
- Anón Festival – September
- Christmas Festival – December
- Christmas Parade – Early December
- Patron Celebrations (The Virgin of the Rosary)—Celebrated in San Germán's Rosario Poblado, which borders the municipality of Mayagüez.

=== Sports ===
San Germán is home to one of Puerto Rico's oldest basketball franchises, dating back to the 1930s, the San Germán Athletics (los Atléticos de San Germán), nicknamed "The Orange Monster". Many glories of Puerto Rican basketball have played in San Germán, a city that is also known as "The Cradle of Puerto Rican Basketball". Some of those players are Arquelio Torres, José "Piculín" Ortiz, Eddie Casiano, Nelson Quiñones, Elías "Larry" Ayuso, Christian Dalmau, and so many others. Their home court is The Arquelio Torres Ramírez Court, which houses approximately 5,000 fans.

The Athletic's fan base is most commonly referred to as their sixth man, or "The Orange Monster". This is because for a visiting team it's extremely hard to win in San Germán due to how vigorous and "into" the game the fans are.

The Athletics have been to 26 National Superior Basketball (BSN) Finals, of which one was cancelled (1953) due to confiscation because of a fight between players from San Germán and the Ponce Lions, giving birth to Puerto Rican basketball's most intense rivalry.

Championships (14): 1932, 1936, 1939, 1941, 1942, 1943, 1947, 1948, 1949, 1950, 1985, 1991, 1994, 1997 Sub-Championships (11): 1931, 1933, 1936, 1938, 1940, 1954, 1955, 1956, 1957, 1965, 1986

== Economy ==
=== Agriculture ===
The area around San Germán grows fruits (banana, pineapple) and sugarcane on mid-scale. Dairy farms are also present in small scale. Some locals grow other produce on a small scale.

=== Business ===
Most businesses are located in or near the downtown area (San Germán Pueblo). Plaza del Oeste is the main shopping center.

=== Industry ===
Major employers of the city include Fresenius Kabi, CCL, Wallace International, Baxter Serum Mfg., Cordis, Insertco (print shop for medical instructions inserts), Wallace Silversmiths de Puerto Rico, General Electric (production of circuit breakers) and several other companies in the service industry.

=== Motion pictures filmed in San Germán ===
- Act of Valor (2012) Which follows a Navy Seal squad on a covert mission to recover a kidnapped CIA Agent Morales (Roselyn Sánchez).
- Dinero Sangre (1986) In a banana republic a ruthless mercenary waits to make a killing in gold. Only two people stand in his way (Guy Ecker)

== Demographics ==
Historical population
Census	Pop.	Note	%±
1900	20,246		—
1910	22,143		9.4%
1920	23,848		7.7%
1930	23,768		−0.3%
1940	26,473		11.4%
1950	29,553		11.6%
1960	27,667		−6.4%
1970	27,990		1.2%
1980	32,922		17.6%
1990	34,962		6.2%
2000	37,105		6.1%
2010	35,527		−4.3%
2020	31,879		−10.3%
2025 (est.)	30,809	▼	−3.4%
U.S. Decennial Census; 1899 (shown as 1900) 1910–1930; 1930–1950 1960–2000 2010 2020

Ethnic distribution
Ethnicity – (self-defined) San Germán, Puerto Rico – 2010 Census
Ethnicity	Population	% of Total
European	29,614	83.4%
African	1,989	5.6%
Native American and Alaska Native	129	0.4%
Asian	41	0.1%
Native Hawaiian; Pacific Islander	5	0.0%
Some other ethnicity	2,992	8.4%
Two or more ethnicities	727	2.1%

== Government ==
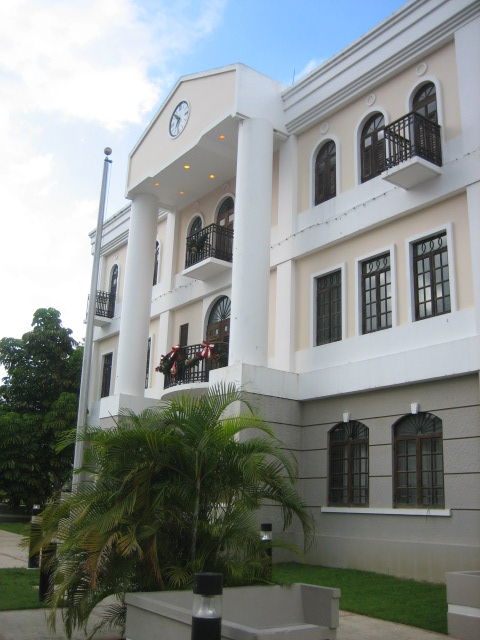
The new City Hall on Luna Street was built in 1989.

Like all municipalities in Puerto Rico, San Germán is administered by a mayor. The current mayor is Virgilio Olivera Olivera from the New Progressive Party. Olivera was first elected in the 2020 general elections.

The city belongs to the Puerto Rico Senatorial district IV, which is represented by two Senators. In 2024, Jeison Rosa and Karen Michelle Román Rodríguez were elected as District Senators.

== Transportation ==
By the 16th century there was a rough road called Camino de Puerto Rico (Camino Real) connecting San Germán (which was located near the mouth of the Añasco River) to other areas of Puerto Rico, including San Sebastián, Arecibo, Toa Alta, and Caparra.

In 2019, there were 44 bridges in San Germán.

== Symbols ==
The municipio has an official flag and coat of arms.

=== Flag ===
Green – The Episcopal dignity and also the color of the Shield of Christopher Columbus and his son, don Diego Colón, Viceroy of the Indies, who named the city in honor of Germane de Foix.

White – The purity of the blood of the great families who colonized San Germán, according to a history book by Fray Íñigo Abbad y Lasierra, a Spanish Benedictine monk.

Purple – Color of the Shield of Juan Ponce de León, first governor of Puerto Rico.

=== Coat of arms ===
First Quarter: The Mitre and the Staff in a green field represent St. Germain of Auxerre, the Patron Saint of the city.

Second Quarter: The second quarter exhibits the arms of the Kingdoms of Aragón and Sicily, where don Fernando the Catholic reigned.

Third Quarter: In this quarter the arms combine with the County of Foix and the Kingdom of France, which constitute the family shields of Germaine de Foix whose name is perpetuated as the name of the city of San Germán.

Fourth Quarter: Is Ponce de León's shield.

The Crown: Is a civic or municipal standard and is used as a stamp for towns and cities; San Germán was assigned five towers to denote that this population formally obtained the title of city from the Spanish crown in the nineteenth century.

== Education ==
The following schools are in San Germán:

1. Bartolome de Las Casas: PK-6
2. Georgina Alvarado: PK-5
3. Henry W. Longfellow: PK-5
4. Herminia C. Ramirez: PK-5
5. Julio Victor Guzman: KG-8
6. Laura Mercado: 6–12
7. Lola Rodriguez de Tio: 9–12
8. Mariano Abril: PK-6
9. (Second Unit) Francisco Maria Quinones: KG-8

The main campus of the Inter-American University of Puerto Rico is located adjacent to the downtown area of San Germán. It was founded in 1912 as the Polytechnical Institute of Puerto Rico, the first private university on the island. The Colegio San José, was a private school which was established in San Germán in 1930 and closed in 2017.

== Puerto Ricans from San Germán ==
- PFC Joseph R. (José) Martínez destroyed a German infantry unit and tank in Tunisia, during World War II, by providing heavy artillery fire, saving his platoon from being attacked in the process. He was awarded the Distinguished Service Cross, second only to the Medal of Honor, by General George S. Patton, thus becoming the first Puerto Rican recipient of said military decoration.
- Ubaldino Ramírez de Arellano—Senator
- Lola Rodríguez de Tió—poet, author of the original lyrics of Puerto Rico's national anthem, La Borinqueña, and pro-independence advocate
- Benjamín Marcantoni – opera singer
- Benicio del Toro—Award-winning actor
- Francisco Mariano Quiñones—Abolitionist and politician
- Samuel R. Quiñones—Longest-serving President of the Puerto Rico Senate, serving for twenty years.

== Gallery ==
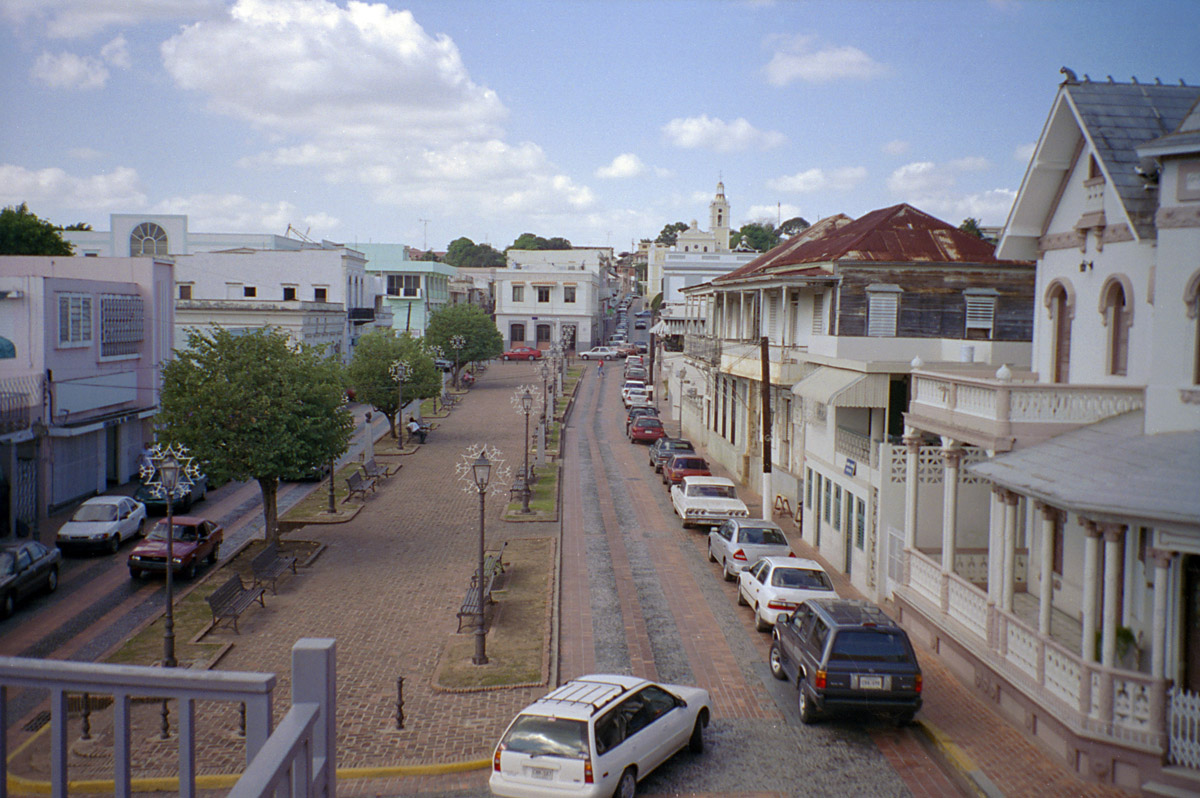
San Germán

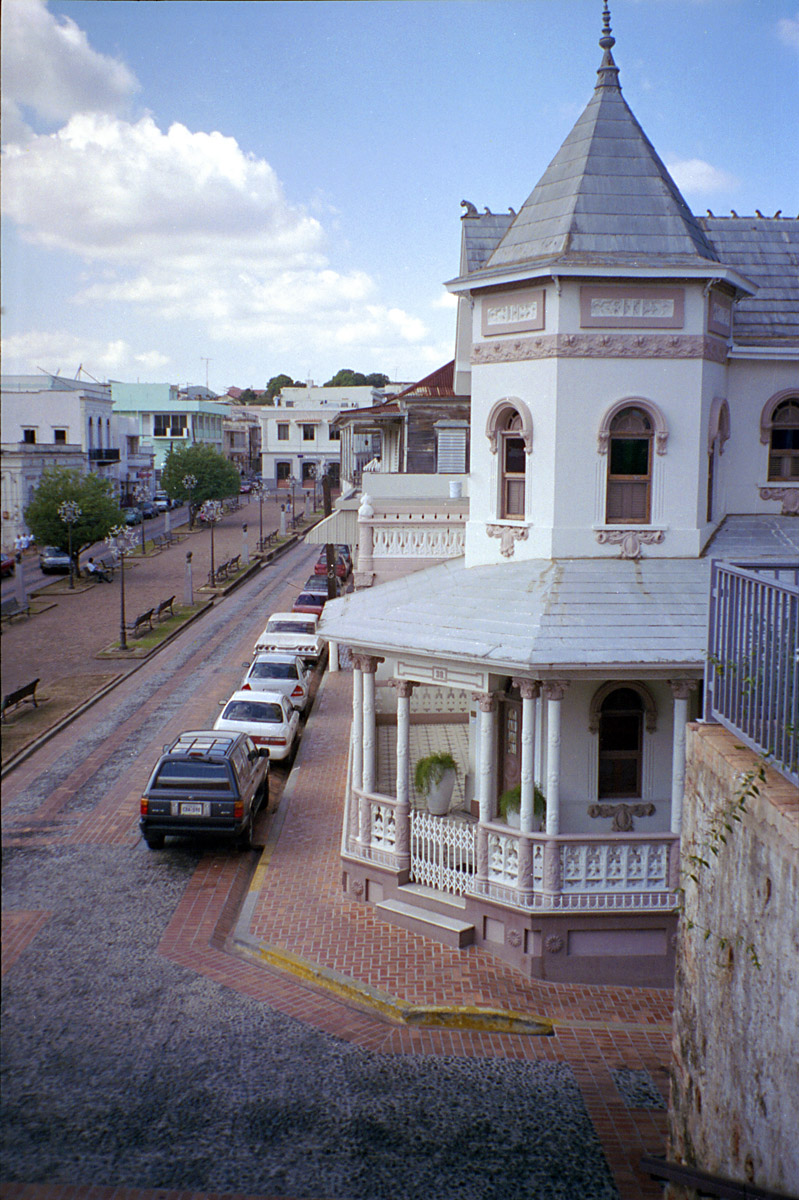
Street in San Germán

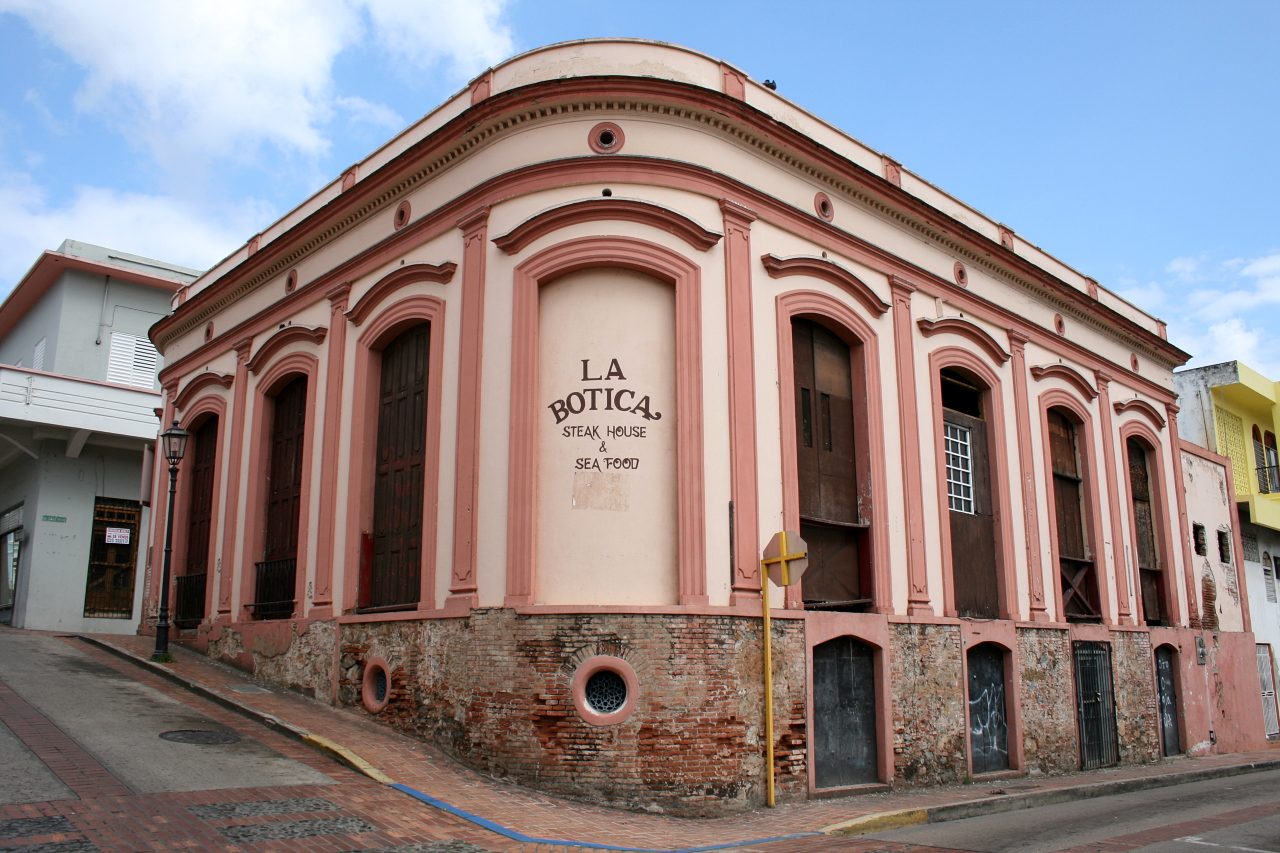
Pharmacy Museum

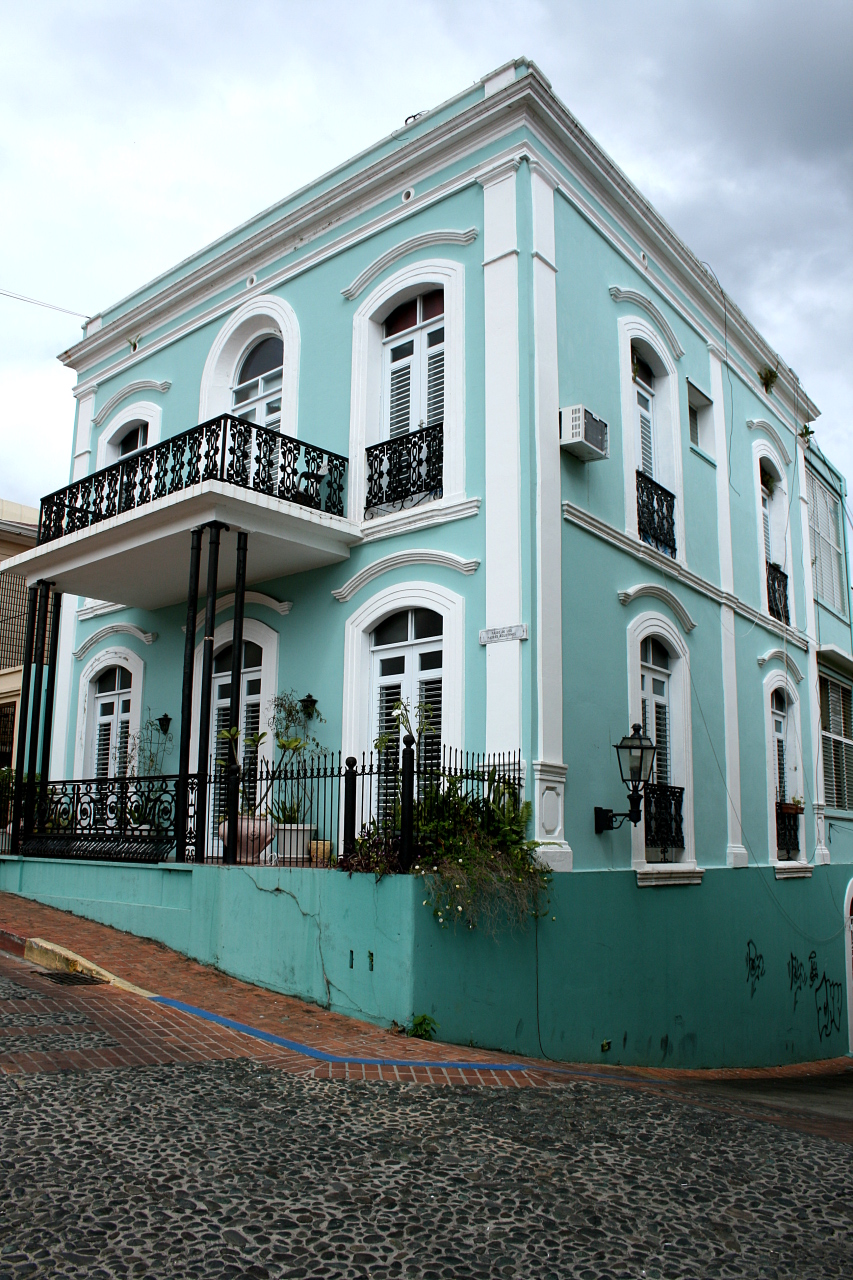
Residential building in San Germán

== See also ==
- List of Puerto Ricans
- History of Puerto Rico
- National Register of Historic Places listings in San Germán, Puerto Rico
- Did you know-Puerto Rico?
