= Tuna, San Germán, Puerto Rico =

Barrio of Puerto Rico

Tuna
- Barrio
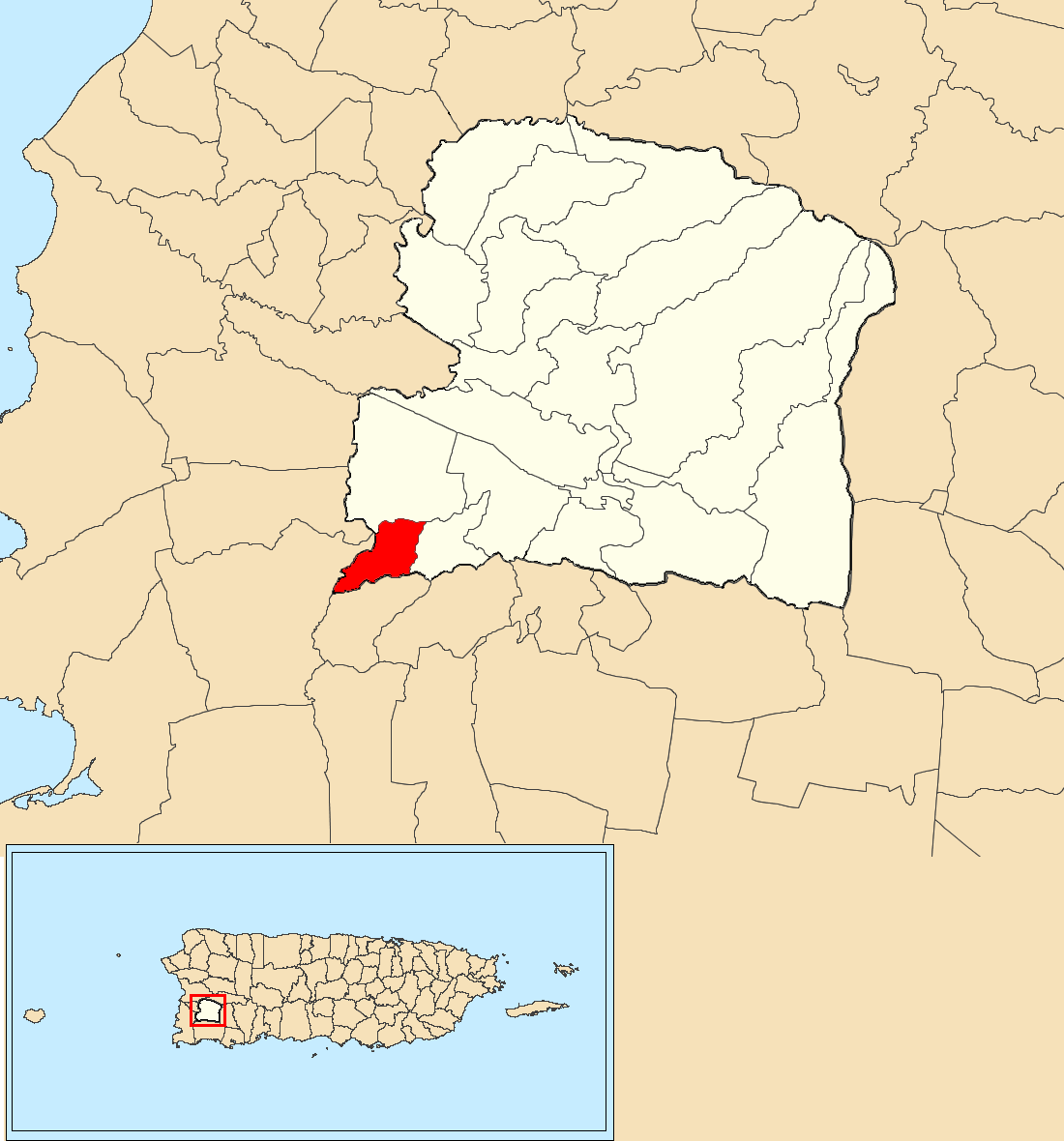
- Location of Tuna within the municipality of San Germán shown in red

- Location of Puerto Rico
- Coordinates: 18°03′56″N 67°05′48″W
- Commonwealth: Puerto Rico
- Municipality: San Germán

Area
  - Total: 0.93 sq mi (2.4 km^{2})
  - Land: 0.93 sq mi (2.4 km^{2})
  - Water: 0 sq mi (0 km^{2})
- Elevation: 528 ft (161 m)

Population (2010)
  - Total: 88
  - Density: 94.6/sq mi (36.5/km^{2})
- Source: 2010 Census
- Time zone: UTC−4 (AST)

Tuna is a barrio in the municipality of San Germán, Puerto Rico. Its population in 2010 was 88.

== History ==
Tuna was in Spain's gazetteers until Puerto Rico was ceded by Spain in the aftermath of the Spanish–American War under the terms of the Treaty of Paris of 1898 and became an unincorporated territory of the United States. In 1899, the United States Department of War conducted a census of Puerto Rico finding that the combined population of Tuna and Maresúa barrios was 1,044.

Historical population
Census	Pop.	Note	%±
1910	678		—
1920	683		0.7%
1930	617		−9.7%
1940	615		−0.3%
1950	570		−7.3%
1960	470		−17.5%
1970	339		−27.9%
1980	294		−13.3%
1990	367		24.8%
2000	139		−62.1%
2010	88		−36.7%
U.S. Decennial Census; 1900 (n/a) 1910-1930; 1930-1950 1980-2000 2010

== See also ==
- List of communities in Puerto Rico
