= Maresúa =

Barrio of San Germán, Puerto Rico

- Barrio
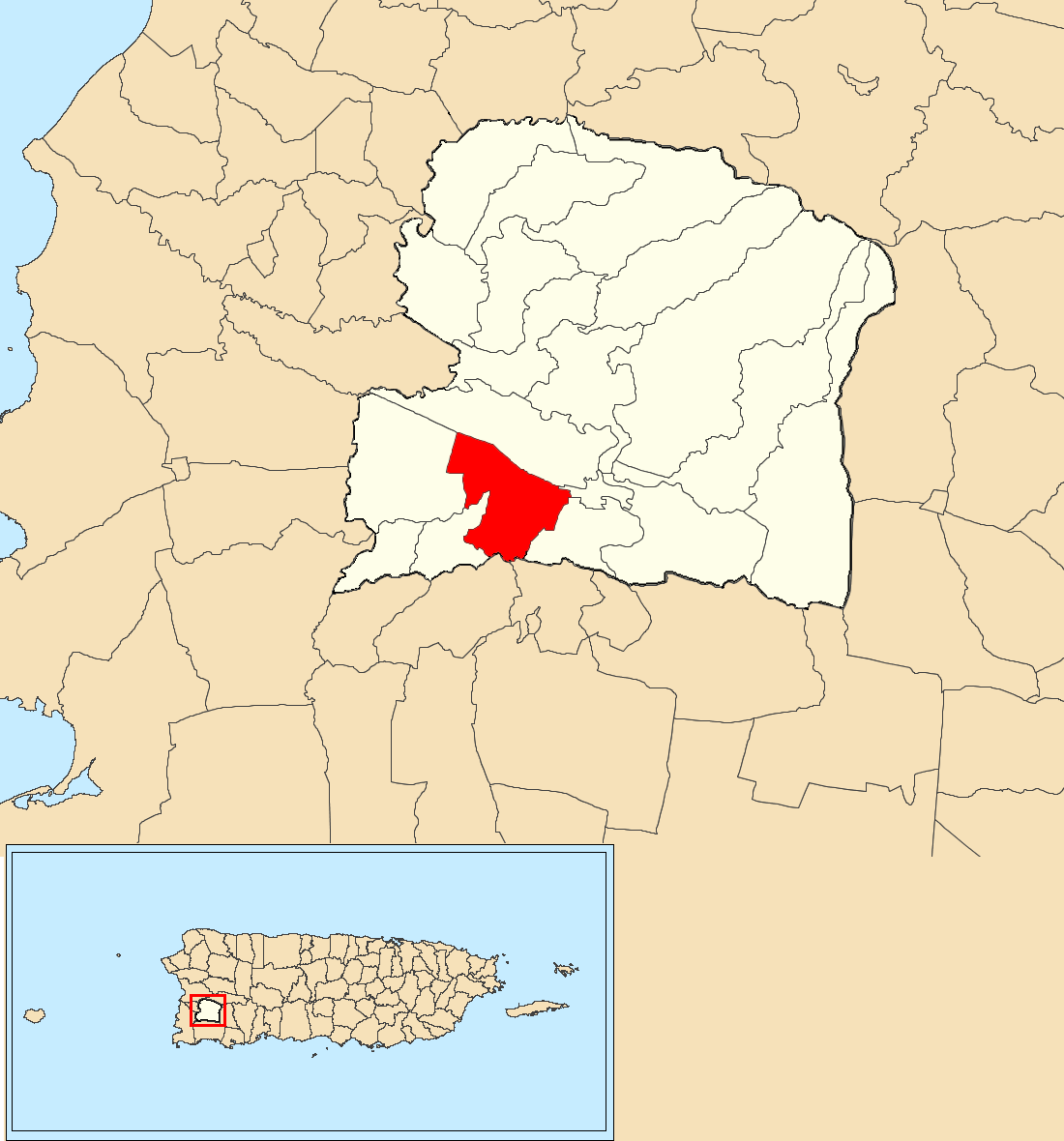
- Location of Maresúa within the municipality of San Germán shown in red

- Location of Puerto Rico
- Coordinates: 18°04′46″N 67°04′00″W
- Commonwealth: Puerto Rico
- Municipality: San Germán

Area
  - Total: 2.24 sq mi (5.8 km^{2})
  - Land: 2.24 sq mi (5.8 km^{2})
  - Water: 0 sq mi (0 km^{2})
- Elevation: 197 ft (60 m)

Population (2010)
  - Total: 1,794
  - Density: 800.9/sq mi (309.2/km^{2})
- Source: 2010 Census
- Time zone: UTC−4 (AST)

Maresúa is a barrio in the municipality of San Germán, Puerto Rico. Its population in 2010 was 1,794.

== History ==
Maresúa was in Spain's gazetteers until Puerto Rico was ceded by Spain in the aftermath of the Spanish–American War under the terms of the Treaty of Paris of 1898 and became an unincorporated territory of the United States. In 1899, the United States Department of War conducted a census of Puerto Rico finding that the combined population of Maresúa and Tuna barrios was 1,044.

Historical population
Census	Pop.	Note	%±
1910	638		—
1920	566		−11.3%
1930	654		15.5%
1940	588		−10.1%
1950	855		45.4%
1960	637		−25.5%
1970	0		−100.0%
1980	803		—
1990	1,207		50.3%
2000	1,231		2.0%
2010	1,794		45.7%
U.S. Decennial Census; 1900 (N/A) 1910-1930; 1930-1950 1980-2000 2010

== See also ==
- List of communities in Puerto Rico
