= Rosario Bajo =

Barrio of San Germán, Puerto Rico

- Barrio
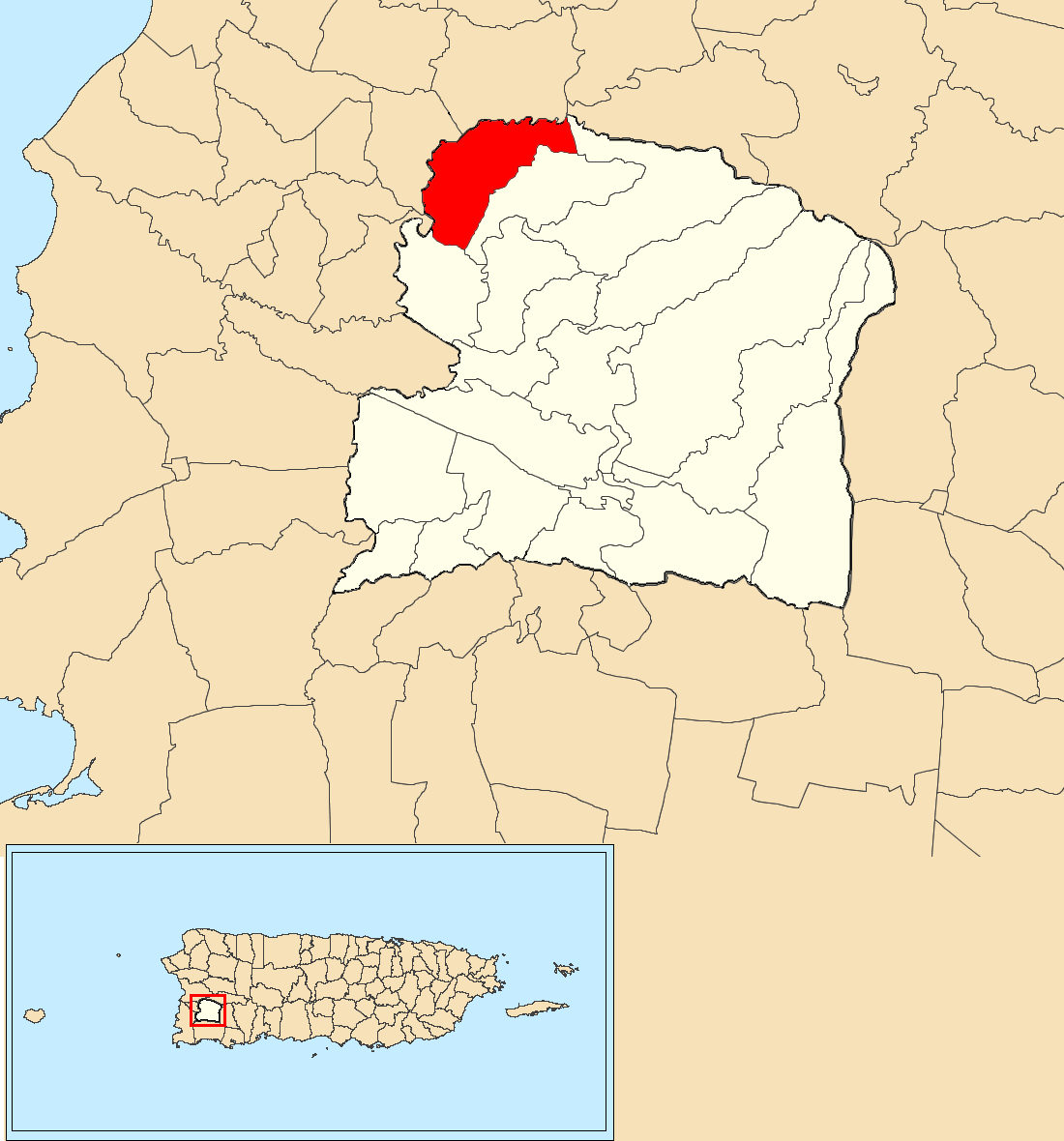
- Location of Rosario Bajo within the municipality of San Germán shown in red

- Location of Puerto Rico
- Coordinates: 18°09′37″N 67°04′19″W
- Commonwealth: Puerto Rico
- Municipality: San Germán

Area
  - Total: 2.73 sq mi (7.1 km^{2})
  - Land: 2.73 sq mi (7.1 km^{2})
  - Water: 0 sq mi (0 km^{2})
- Elevation: 276 ft (84 m)

Population (2010)
  - Total: 1,544
  - Density: 563.5/sq mi (217.6/km^{2})
- Source: 2010 Census
- Time zone: UTC−4 (AST)

Rosario Bajo is a barrio in the municipality of San Germán, Puerto Rico. Its population in 2010 was 1,544.

== History ==
Rosario Bajo was in Spain's gazetteers until Puerto Rico was ceded by Spain in the aftermath of the Spanish–American War under the terms of the Treaty of Paris of 1898 and became an unincorporated territory of the United States. In 1899, the United States Department of War conducted a census of Puerto Rico finding that the population of Rosario Bajo barrio was 1,027.

Historical population
Census	Pop.	Note	%±
1900	1,047		—
1910	920		−12.1%
1920	1,007		9.5%
1930	1,015		0.8%
1940	981		−3.3%
1950	1,045		6.5%
1960	954		−8.7%
1970	1,002		5.0%
1980	1,409		40.6%
1990	1,251		−11.2%
2000	1,675		33.9%
2010	1,544		−7.8%
U.S. Decennial Census; 1899 (shown as 1900) 1910-1930; 1930-1950 1980-2000 2010

== See also ==
- List of communities in Puerto Rico
