= Caín Alto =

Barrio of San Germán, Puerto Rico

- Barrio
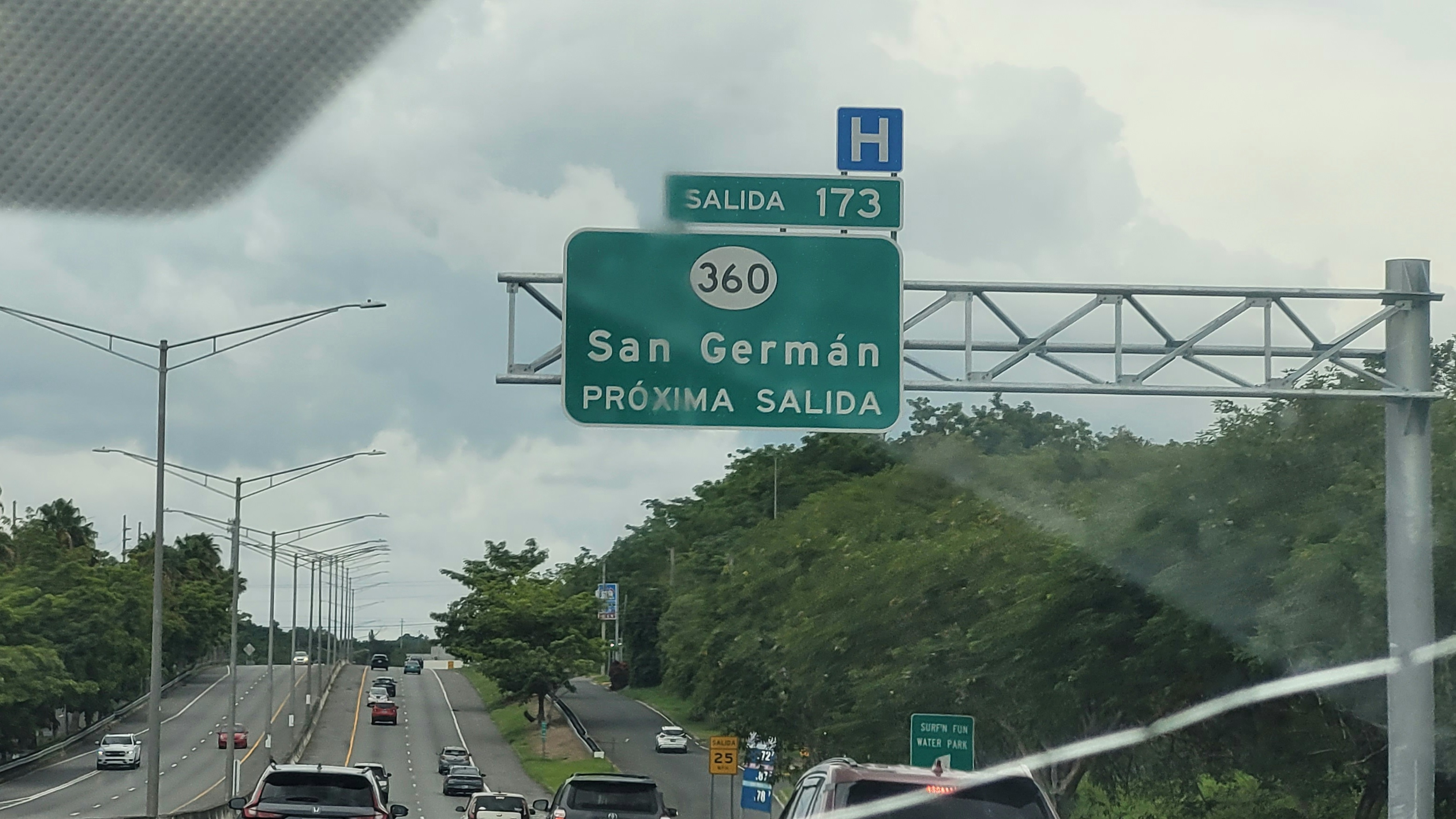
- Puerto Rico Highway 2 in Caín Alto

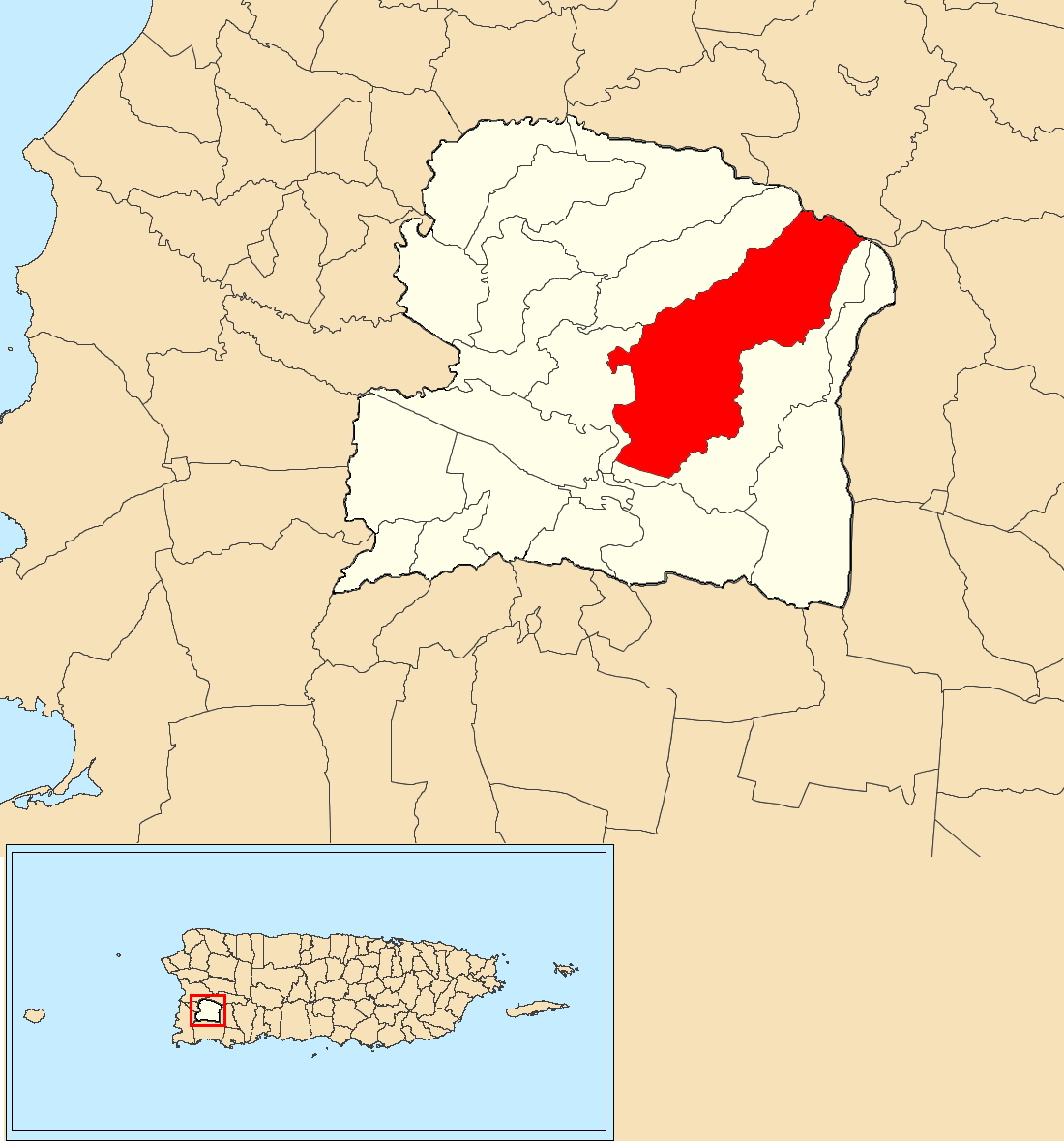
- Location of Caín Alto within the municipality of San Germán shown in red

- Location of Puerto Rico
- Coordinates: 18°07′00″N 67°01′04″W
- Commonwealth: Puerto Rico
- Municipality: San Germán

Area
  - Total: 7.93 sq mi (20.5 km^{2})
  - Land: 7.93 sq mi (20.5 km^{2})
  - Water: 0 sq mi (0 km^{2})
- Elevation: 738 ft (225 m)

Population (2010)
  - Total: 2,830
  - Density: 357.3/sq mi (138.0/km^{2})
- Source: 2010 Census
- Time zone: UTC−4 (AST)

Caín Alto is a barrio in the municipality of San Germán, Puerto Rico. Its population in 2010 was 2,830.

== History ==
Caín Alto was in Spain's gazetteers until Puerto Rico was ceded by Spain in the aftermath of the Spanish–American War under the terms of the Treaty of Paris of 1898 and became an unincorporated territory of the United States. In 1899, the United States Department of War conducted a census of Puerto Rico finding that the population of Caín Alto barrio was 1,643.

Historical population
Census	Pop.	Note	%±
1900	1,643		—
1910	1,715		4.4%
1920	1,833		6.9%
1930	1,680		−8.3%
1940	1,730		3.0%
1950	2,395		38.4%
1960	2,360		−1.5%
1970	0		−100.0%
1980	2,220		—
1990	2,580		16.2%
2000	3,064		18.8%
2010	2,830		−7.6%
U.S. Decennial Census; 1899 (shown as 1900) 1910-1930; 1930-1950 1980-2000 2010

== See also ==
- List of communities in Puerto Rico
