= Duey Alto, San Germán, Puerto Rico =

Barrio of Puerto Rico

Duey Alto
- Barrio
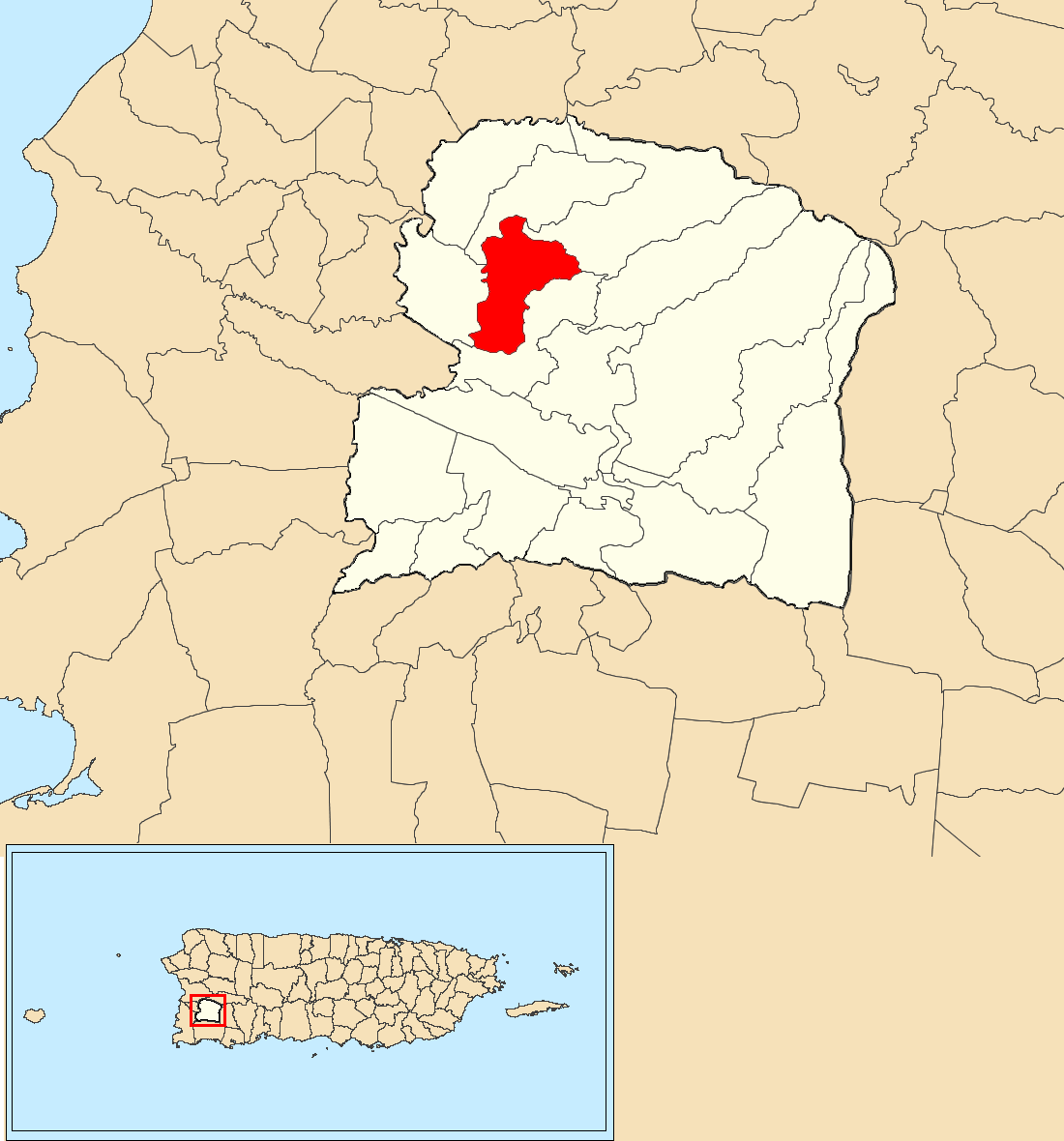
- Location of Duey Alto within the municipality of San Germán shown in red

- Location of Puerto Rico
- Coordinates: 18°07′58″N 67°03′50″W
- Commonwealth: Puerto Rico
- Municipality: San Germán

Area
  - Total: 2.02 sq mi (5.2 km^{2})
  - Land: 2.02 sq mi (5.2 km^{2})
  - Water: 0 sq mi (0 km^{2})
- Elevation: 220 ft (67 m)

Population (2010)
  - Total: 1,350
  - Density: 668.3/sq mi (258.0/km^{2})
- Source: 2010 Census
- Time zone: UTC−4 (AST)

Duey Alto is a barrio in the municipality of San Germán, Puerto Rico. Its population in 2010 was 1,350.

== History ==
Duey Alto was in Spain's gazetteers until Puerto Rico was ceded by Spain in the aftermath of the Spanish–American War under the terms of the Treaty of Paris of 1898 and became an unincorporated territory of the United States. In 1899, the United States Department of War conducted a census of Puerto Rico finding that the combined population of Duey Alto and Rosario Peñón barrios was 1,100.

Historical population
Census	Pop.	Note	%±
1910	611		—
1920	672		10.0%
1930	630		−6.2%
1940	628		−0.3%
1950	760		21.0%
1960	634		−16.6%
1970	584		−7.9%
1980	770		31.8%
1990	1,075		39.6%
2000	1,471		36.8%
2010	1,350		−8.2%
U.S. Decennial Census; 1900 (N/A) 1910-1930; 1930-1950 1980-2000 2010

== See also ==
- List of communities in Puerto Rico
