= Benjamín Marcantoni =

American opera singer

Puerto Rican countertenor Benjamin Marcantoni is an opera singer. He is known for his dramatic connection to the material and a voice of uncommon size and range.

== Life and career ==
Marcantoni was born Rafael Alfonso Quiñones in San Germán, Puerto Rico. Even untrained, his boy soprano caught the ear of his school's music teacher early on. He went on to study voice as a tenor at Interamerican University of Puerto Rico, and then received his graduate degree from University of Nevada, Reno.

He came to New York City in late 1999 where he is well known in the underground and experimental theater scene. Displeased with his accomplishments as a tenor, Marcantoni officially changed fachs circa 2001. A member of the internationally renowned Great Jones Repertory Company of La MaMa, E.T.C. since 2003, he is currently on the voice faculty at the Interamerican University of Puerto Rico, San Germán campus. He is a member of the early music ensemble Camerata Vivace, as well as being a part of the music, art, dance, and theater fusion project known as Iluminata.
