= Duey Bajo, San Germán, Puerto Rico =

Barrio of Puerto Rico

Duey Bajo
- Barrio
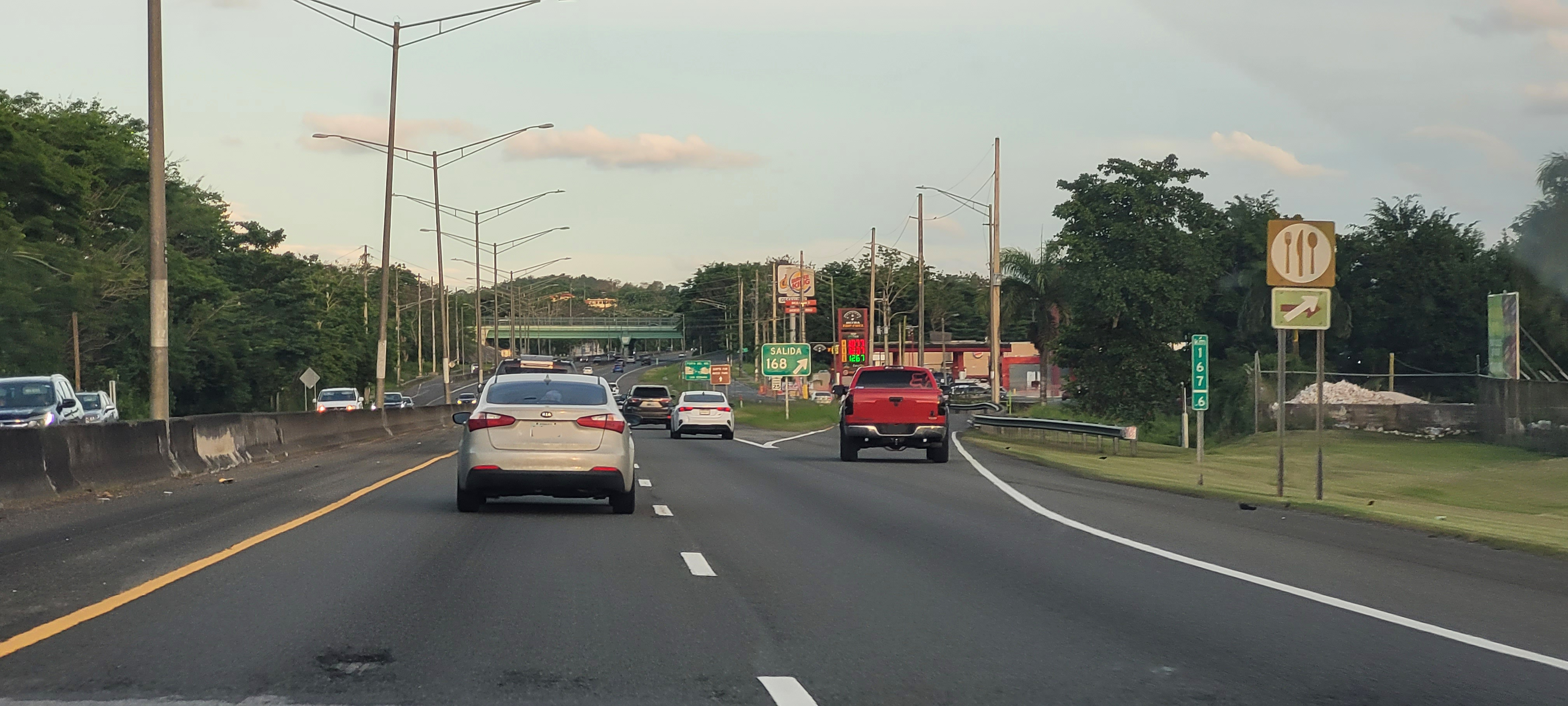
- Puerto Rico Highway 2 between Benavente and Duey Bajo

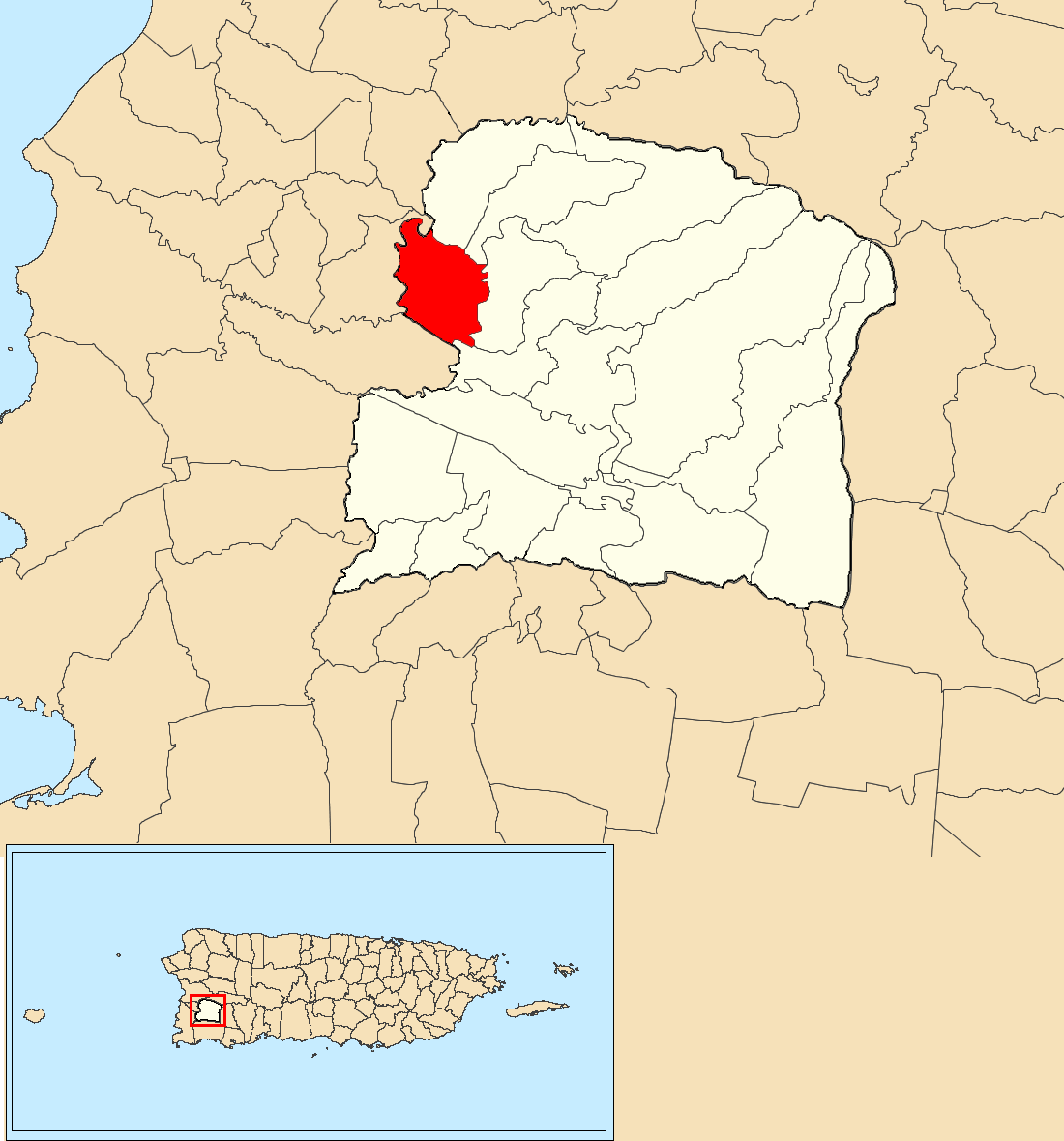
- Location of Duey Bajo within the municipality of San Germán shown in red

- Location of Puerto Rico
- Coordinates: 18°07′56″N 67°04′58″W
- Commonwealth: Puerto Rico
- Municipality: San Germán

Area
  - Total: 2.1 sq mi (5.4 km^{2})
  - Land: 2.1 sq mi (5.4 km^{2})
  - Water: 0 sq mi (0 km^{2})
- Elevation: 262 ft (80 m)

Population (2010)
  - Total: 980
  - Density: 466.7/sq mi (180.2/km^{2})
- Source: 2010 Census
- Time zone: UTC−4 (AST)

Duey Bajo is a barrio in the municipality of San Germán, Puerto Rico. Its population in 2010 was 980.

== History ==
Duey Bajo was in Spain's gazetteers until Puerto Rico was ceded by Spain in the aftermath of the Spanish–American War under the terms of the Treaty of Paris of 1898 and became an unincorporated territory of the United States. In 1899, the United States Department of War conducted a census of Puerto Rico finding that the population of Duey Bajo barrio was 943.

Historical population
Census	Pop.	Note	%±
1900	943		—
1910	950		0.7%
1920	974		2.5%
1930	896		−8.0%
1940	992		10.7%
1950	1,007		1.5%
1960	831		−17.5%
1970	615		−26.0%
1980	1,208		96.4%
1990	1,025		−15.1%
2000	951		−7.2%
2010	980		3.0%
U.S. Decennial Census; 1899 (shown as 1900) 1910-1930; 1930-1950 1980-2000 2010

== See also ==
- List of communities in Puerto Rico
