= Duey River (San Germán, Puerto Rico) =

River of Puerto Rico

- Location of Duey River within Puerto Rico
- Native name: Río Duey (Spanish)

Location
- Commonwealth: Puerto Rico
- Municipality: San Germán

Physical characteristics
- Source
  - coordinates: 18.1630125°N 67.0504571°W
- Mouth
  - coordinates: 18.1171812°N 67.0737903°W

The Duey River (Spanish: Río Duey) is a river located in San Germán, Puerto Rico.

== See also ==
- List of rivers of Puerto Rico
