= List of the oldest buildings in the United States =

This article lists the oldest buildings in the United States and its territories. The list includes sites in current states and territories which were not part of the original Thirteen Colonies when the United States of America was founded in 1776.

== Pre-Columbian era ==
Building	Image	Location	State	First built	Use	Notes
Ancestral Puebloan dwellings		New Mexico, Arizona, Colorado, Utah	NM; AZ; CO; UT	750 – Pueblo construction began in AD 750, and ended around 1300 AD with the third era of the Pueblo people.	Villages	Majority of settlements abandoned, but some very well preserved. Buildings have been within the United States since the Mexican Cession of 1848 or the Gadsden Purchase of 1854.
Chaco Canyon		New Mexico (Between Albuquerque and Farmington)	NM	c. 800s – "During the middle and late 800s, the great houses of Pueblo Bonito, Una Vida, and Peñasco Blanco were constructed, followed by Hungo Pavi, Chetro Ketl, Pueblo Alto, and others."	Residential, villages, city	"The cultural flowering of the Chacoan people began in the mid 800s and lasted more than 300 years."
Ocmulgee Earth Lodge		Ocmulgee Mounds National Historical Park	GA	1015	Religious	Native American earth lodge. Restored by the Civilian Conservation Corps in the 1930s.
Cliff Palace		Mesa Verde National Park	CO	1190	Residential	Largest cliff dwelling in North America. Buildings have been within the United States since the Mexican Cession of 1848.
Malae Heiau		Wailua River State Park	HI	before 1200	Religious	Largest heiau remaining on the Island of Kauai and one of the largest surviving temple platforms in the Hawaiian Islands.
Acoma Pueblo		On top of a 367-foot (112 m) sandstone mesa in Cibola County	NM	c. 1000-1200	Residential	Buildings have been within the United States since the Mexican Cession of 1848.
Casa Grande		Coolidge	AZ	c. 1200s	Religious	Hohokam structures built in the 13th century that includes a large four-story structure that is protected by a New Deal era canopy.
Taos Pueblo		North of the modern city of Taos	NM	c. Late 13th century to early 14th century	Residential	Buildings have been within the United States since the Mexican Cession of 1848.
West Oak Forest Earthlodge Site		Glenwood	IA	c. 1250–1400	Religious	Earthlodge built during the Woodland period of pre-Columbian history. Discovered and restored in 2009.
House of Taga		Tinian	MP	before 1500	Residential	The latte stone structure is believed to have been the home of a Chamorro chief. The structure has been on US territory since 1978 when the Northern Mariana Islands became a US commonwealth.

== 16th century ==
Building	Image	Town/City	State	Date of Construction	Type of Building	Notes
La Casa Blanca		Old San Juan	PR	1521	Government/Residential	Located in the Old San Juan National Historic Landmark District. Built as a fortified residence for Juan Ponce de León. The house has been on U.S. territory since Puerto Rico was annexed in 1898.
San José Church		Old San Juan	PR	1528	Religious	Located in the Old San Juan National Historic Landmark District. Additions and renovations over the centuries. The church has been on U.S. territory since Puerto Rico was annexed in 1898.
La Fortaleza		Old San Juan	PR	1533	Government	Located in the Old San Juan National Historic Landmark District. Oldest executive mansion in the New World. Extensive reconstructions took place over the centuries. Building has been within the U.S. since 1898 when Puerto Rico was annexed.
Castillo San Felipe del Morro		Old San Juan	PR	1539	Government	Part of the San Juan National Historic Site. Construction started in 1539, with extensive additions over the centuries. Building has been within the U.S. since 1898 when Puerto Rico was annexed.
Cathedral of San Juan Bautista		Old San Juan	PR	1540	Religious	Located in the Old San Juan National Historic Landmark District. Oldest church building in the U.S. and its territories, original built in 1521 on modern-day location (extensive additions and renovations). The cathedral has been on U.S. territory since Puerto Rico was annexed in 1898.

== 17th century ==
Building	Image	Location	State	First built	Use	Notes
San Juan City Hall		Old San Juan	PR	1604	Government	Oldest building used as a city hall in Puerto Rico, first built as the Cabildo de Puerto Rico. Built in stages between 1604 and 1789. The façade dates to 1840.
Porta Coeli		San Germán	PR	1609	Religious	Located in the San Germán Historic District. The church has been on US territory since Puerto Rico was annexed in 1898.
Palace of the Governors		Santa Fe	NM	1610	Government	Oldest seat of colonial government (Spanish). Building has been within the United States since the Mexican Cession of 1848.
San Miguel Chapel	San Miguel Chapel, Christian Brothers, St Michael's High School	Santa Fe	NM	1610	Religious/Community	The oldest church or religious structure in the continental US built by indigenous Mexicans with Spanish Franciscans.
C. A. Nothnagle Log House		Gibbstown	NJ	c. 1638–43	Residential	Purportedly the oldest surviving log house in the U.S., once part of New Sweden, and the oldest house in NJ, and hence Gloucester County
Jamestown Church		Jamestown, Virginia	VA	1639	Religious	Church tower and foundations are all that remain from the earliest period, 1639–1647.
Thomas Bourne House		Marshfield	MA	1639 c.	Residential	Located at 1308 Ocean Street; house is believed to date from 1639.
Henry Whitfield House		Guilford	CT	1639	Residential	Oldest stone American Colonial house; oldest house in Connecticut.
Buckingham House		Milford	CT	1640	Residential	
Lower Swedish Cabin		Upper Darby	PA	c. 1640	Residential	One of the earliest extant examples of Swedish log construction in the United States. Believed to be the oldest building in Pennsylvania.
Richard Sparrow House		Plymouth	MA	1640	Residential	Oldest house in Plymouth, Massachusetts.
Samuel Lucius-Thomas Howland House		Plymouth	MA	1640 c.	Residential	Located at 36 North Street near Plymouth Rock; House is believed to date from 1640.
Wing Fort House		East Sandwich	MA	1641	Residential	The Wing Fort House is a historic house in East Sandwich, MA. It was added to the National Register of Historic Places in 1976, and is owned by the Wing Family of America, Inc
Fairbanks House		Dedham	MA	1641	Residential	Oldest house in America verified using dendrochronology.
Edmond Hawes–Barker Hunt House		Duxbury	MA	1641 c.	Residential	aka as the Edwin Hunt House at 8 Hounds Ditch Lane; House is believed to date from 1641.
Rev. John Lothrop House		Barnstable	MA	c. 1644	Parsonage	Oldest building housing a public library in the country. Built c. 1644 for Rev. John Lothrop. 2014 architectural survey supports the 1644 date.
Feake-Ferris House	Greenwich's first house, the Feake-Ferris House, with newer wing (main house) on left added in the 21st century.	Greenwich	CT	c. 1645	Residential	Oldest building in Fairfield County, basement dates to 1640. Later alterations in the later 1600s.
Shatswell Planter's Cottage		Ipswich	MA	c. 1646	Residential	Currently located on the property at 53 Jeffrey's Neck Rd where it was moved in the twentieth century from another location: "originally located at 88-90 High Street [where it was] the earliest of the three First Period structures on the site, dating to before 1646"; House is believed to date from 1646.
De Vargas Street House		Santa Fe	NM	1646	Residential	Previously claimed to be oldest house in the United States and Santa Fe.
Wing Fort House		East Sandwich	MA	1646	Residential	Oldest home in New England continuously owned by the same family; now a museum.
John Ellis House		Sandwich	MA	1647	Residential	located at 76 Main Street.
El Cuartelejo		Scott City	KS	1650	Residential	Northernmost Indian pueblo and the only known pueblo located in Kansas and the Midwest.
Edward Wilder Homestead		Hingham, Massachusetts	MA	1650	Residential	2nd oldest home standing in Hingham.
Farris Windmill		Dearborn	MI	1650	Agriculture	Oldest windmill built in the United States. Originally built on Cape Cod, it was moved to The Henry Ford museum's Greenfield Village outdoor complex in the 1920s.
Wyckoff House		Brooklyn	NY	1652	Residential	Oldest house in New York City.
Brooke Place Manor		Calvert County	MD	1652	Residential	Oldest building in Maryland.
Loomis Homestead		Windsor	CT	1653	Residential	One of the oldest timber-frame houses in America. The oldest part of the house was built between 1640 and 1653 by Joseph Loomis, who came to Connecticut Colony from England in 1638. Later additions to the Loomis house were made around the turn of the 18th century. It is now a part of the Loomis Chaffee School.
Newman–Fiske–Dodge House		Wenham	MA	1658	Residential	Added to the National Register of Historic Places in 1990.
John Partridge House		Millis	MA	1659	Residential	
Thomas Lee House		East Lyme	CT	1660	Residential	
Broad Bay Manor		Virginia Beach	VA	c. 1660	Residential	Purportedly the oldest extant European-built house in the southeastern United States. Built by Thomas Allen either c. 1640 or c. 1660 on land granted to him by Governor Thomas West, 3rd Baron De La Warr. The small center portion of what is now a much larger structure, it was primarily constructed with Flemish bond brickwork. Corroborative dating efforts have not been performed. It has always been a private residence. It is located in the Broad Bay Colony part of northeastern Virginia Beach.
Edward Harraden House		Gloucester	MA	1660	Residential	
William Whipple House		Kittery	ME	1660	Residential	Oldest portion of home dates to circa 1660 and was birthplace of General William Whipple, Signer of the Declaration of Independence; located at 88 Whipple Road Possibly the oldest house in Maine.
Zachariah Hawkins House		Brookhaven	NY	1660	Residential	
James Blake House		Boston	MA	1661	Residential	Oldest house in the city of Boston. Verified by Oxford Tree-Ring Dating Lab.
Iglesia San Blas de Illescas		Coamo	PR	1661	Religious	Considered one of the most important works of religious architecture in Puerto Rico. The church has been on US territory since Puerto Rico was annexed in 1898.
Ambrose Gale House		Marblehead	MA	1663	Residential	Ambrose Gale lived here in 1692. Gale, his daughter, Charity Pitman, testified against Wilmott Redd, who was hanged during the Salem Witch Trials in 1692.
Bronck House		Coxsackie	NY	1663	Residential	Oldest house in upstate New York.
Richard Jackson House		Portsmouth	NH	1664	Residential	Oldest house in New Hampshire.
Pickering House		Salem	MA	1664	Residential	Located in the Chestnut Street District.
Thomas Lee House		East Lyme	CT	1664	Residential	One of the oldest wood-frame houses in Connecticut still in its primitive state.
Deacon John Moore House		Windsor	CT	1664	Residential	Moore was also a woodworker known for using the foliated vine design, which depicts vines and blossoms carved in shallow relief with flat surfaces.
Reverend James Keith Parsonage		West Bridgewater	MA	1664	Residential	Preserved and maintained by the Old Bridgewater Historical Society.
Gedney House		Salem	MA	1665	Residential	Allegedly the second oldest house in the City of Salem, located in the Chestnut Street District and operated as a non-profit museum by Historic New England. The house is rarely open to the public, though private tours can be arranged.
Bacon's Castle		Surry	VA	1665	Residential	Located at 465 Bacon's Castle Trail, this is perhaps the oldest intact building with satisfactorily credible age authentication still standing in the Commonwealth of Virginia (and perhaps the entire Southeastern region of the US) and one of the oldest brick buildings still standing in the United States. If Broad Bay Manor's age is authenticated, it could predate Bacon's Castle by up to 25 years.
Billiou-Stillwell-Perine House		Staten Island	NY	1665 c.	Residential	Built by Pierre Billiou, a French Huguenot pioneer, the house is now a museum.
Ryves Holt House		Lewes	DE	1665	Residential	Purportedly the oldest house in Delaware.
Brewster House		East Setauket	NY	1665	Residential	One of the oldest houses on Long Island.
Sip Manor		Jersey City; Westfield	NJ	1666	Residential	Originally part of Bergen, New Netherland, relocated in 1926 from Hudson County and now oldest building in Union County
Jabez Howland House		Plymouth	MA	1667	Residential	Only extant house in Plymouth occupied by Pilgrims. John Howland and his wife, Elizabeth Tilley Howland, who both came over on the Mayflower, spent their winters here with their son, Jabez, one of their ten children. Also a National Historic Landmark.
Dillingham House		Brewster	MA	1667	Residential	
Robert Coles Homestead		Glen Cove	NY	1668	Residential	In May 1668, Joseph Carpenter of Rhode Island negotiated with the Matinecock Indians to purchase several hundred acres of land on which to build a saw mill and grist mill in what was then Musketa Cove. Robert Coles was one of the "Five Proprietors of the Musketa Cove Patent" and was the first to build his homestead at what is now 34 The Place. He and his wife, Mercy Wright of Oyster Bay, had nine children and lived in the eastern-most wing of the existing property which still stands today.
House of the Seven Gables		Salem	MA	1668	Residential	National Historic Landmark, setting of the Nathaniel Hawthorne novel.
John Bowne House		Flushing, Queens	NY	1668	Residential	Listed on the National Register of Historic Places in 1977. 2006 Dendrochronology survey confirmed date of 1668.
Acadian House		Guilford	CT	1670	Residential	
Abraham Manee House		Staten Island	NY	1670	Residential	The Abraham Manee House, also known as the Manee–Seguine Homestead, is a three-part Colonial Dutch dwelling similar to the Billiou–Stillwell–Perine House in Old Town, and was designated a New York City landmark in 1984.
Zaccheus Gould House		Topsfield	MA	1670	Residential	
Swett–Ilsley House		Newbury	MA	1670	Residential	
Chaplin–Clarke House		Rowley	MA	1670	Residential	
Dr. Philip Turner House		Norwich	CT	1670	Residential	
Cubberly–Britton Cottage		Staten Island	NY	1671	Residential	
Merchant–Choate House		Ipswich	MA	1671	Residential	Also, known as Tuttle House (103 High Street). The House is dated from 1670/71. Dendrochronology dating it from the 1670s with some earlier beams and bracing, and possibly an earlier construction date.
Nehemiah Royce House		Wallingford	CT	1672		
Pickman House		Salem	MA	1672	Residential	Located on Charter Street behind the Peabody Essex Museum, the oldest continually operated museum in America. The house abuts the Witch Memorial and is also next to the second oldest burying ground in America. The house is private, owned by the Peabody Essex Museum and not open for tours.
White Horse Tavern		Newport	RI	1673	Tavern	Oldest tavern in America. Originally constructed in 1652 as a residence for judge Francis Brinley, converted to a tavern in 1673.
Brown House		Hamilton	MA	1673	Residential	
Old Trinity Church, Maryland		Church Creek	MD	1675	Religious	Church building in continuous use; as such, oldest in the United States.
Leffingwell Inn		Norwich	CT	1675	Inn	
Narbonne House		Salem	MA	1675	Residential	The house is on the waterfront in Salem and is part of the Salem Maritime National Historic Site. The site has 12 historic structures, including the Customs House, and a replica of the sailing ship Friendship of Salem.
Hoxie House		Sandwich	MA	c. 1675	Residential	One of the oldest houses on Cape Cod.
The Witch House		Salem	MA	c. 1675	Residential	Also called the Jonathan Corwin House, this was the home of Judge Jonathan Corwin and is the only structure still standing in Salem, Massachusetts with direct ties to the Salem witch trials of 1692. Even though Jonathan Corwin's descendants claim the house was built in 1642, most historians now believe the house was built c. 1675. The house, located in the Chestnut Street District, is now a museum operated by the City of Salem and is open seasonally.
St. Mary's, Whitechapel		Lancaster, Virginia	VA	1675	Religious	
Deane Winthrop House		Winthrop	MA	1675	Residential	The oldest part of the house was built about 1675 with an addition made in 1696. It is currently owned by the Winthrop Improvement and Historical Association and is open to visitors by appointment.
Edward Sewall Garrison		Exeter	NH	1676	Residential	
Old Senate House		Kingston	NY	1676	Governmental	New York State Constitution written and signed here.
Lowland Cottage		Ware Neck	VA	1676	Residential.	
Edward Searle House		Cranston	RI	1677	Residential	The house was rebuilt in 1677 on the site of the original 1670 structure, destroyed by Native Americans during King Philip's War.
John Whipple House		Ipswich	MA	1677	Residential	In 2005 a dendrochronology test determined that the earliest surviving part of the house was actually built in 1677. A major addition of roughly equal size was built in 1690, and there are various later additions.
Newport Tower		Newport	RI	1677 c.	Commercial	Colonial windmill. No roof or floors since the mid-18th century.
Thomas Fenner House		Cranston	RI	1677	Residential	early stone ender.
Town Point		Dover	DE	1677	Residential	
General Israel Putnam House		Danvers	MA	1677	Residential	Recorded in the National Register of Historic Places. The house is now operated by the Danvers Historical Society and open by appointment. Once thought to date from 1648, tree-ring dating has since proved otherwise.
Joshua Hempstead House		New London	CT	1678	Residential	Built about 1678 and altered several times during the 18th century, it is one of the Connecticut's oldest surviving buildings, and provides a virtual catalog of early construction methods due to its state of preservation.
Coffin House		Newbury	MA	1678	Residential	Built by Tristram Coffin, Jr., in 1678, the property remained within the Coffin family until acquired by Historic New England in 1929. It is now a museum.
329 Kent Road		New Milford	CT	1678	Residential	Formerly the North Country Inn, old section from 1678 with beehive oven, later main section from the mid to late 1700s. Currently listed for sale as of June 2026
Smith's Castle		Wickford	RI	1678	Residential	One of the oldest houses in Rhode Island, now a museum.
Elisha Bushnell House		Old Saybrook	CT	1678	Residential	The Colonial property includes two contributing buildings, the second being termed the "Slave House". Has not been verified with dendrochronology.
Blackbeard's Castle		Charlotte Amalie	VI	1679	Military	Watchtower used by the Danes to protect the harbor from attacks. Has been on US soil since the 1917 purchase of the islands from Denmark.
Clement Weaver House		East Greenwich	RI	1679	Residential	Oldest privately owned house in Rhode Island.
John Balch House		Beverly	MA	c. 1679	Residential	John Balch received the deed to the land on which the house sits in 1635; the building was constructed by Balch's son and grandson in 1678/1679, and is one of the oldest continuously privately deeded properties in the United States. The original structure in the front dates to 1679, while the back half addition is dated to 1721;.
Parker House		Old Saybrook	CT	1679	Residential	Has not been verified with dendrochronology.
Paul Revere House		Boston	MA	c. 1680	Residential	Oldest building in downtown Boston.
Fort Christian		Charlotte Amalie	VI	1680	Military	Fort originally built by the Danish, oldest building in the US Virgin Islands. Has been on US soil since the 1917 purchase of the Virgin Islands from Denmark.
Peter Tufts House		Medford	MA	1680	Residential	Some historians consider it to be the oldest all-brick house in the United States.
Timothy Knapp House		Rye	NY	1680	Residential	Considered the oldest residential property in Westchester County, New York. The property has been owned by only five families between 1663 and 1992. Listed on the National Register of Historic Places in 1992.
Conference House		Staten Island	NY	1680	Residential	Only pre-Revolutionary manor house still surviving in New York City.
John Hollister House		South Glastonbury	CT	1680	Residential	Seventeenth century deeds describe this house being on "The Great River".
Stephen Foster House		Topsfield	MA	1680	Residential	
Capt. William Green House		Wakefield	MA	1680	Residential	
Hart House		Ipswich	MA	1680	Residential	Now a tavern. It is located at 51 Linebrook Road and was dated using dendrochronology in 2006 One room is at the Metropolitan Museum of Art.
Van Nostrand-Starkins House		Roslyn	NY	1680	Residential	In the Main Street Historic District (Roslyn, New York).
Capt. John Mawdsley House		Newport	RI	1680	Residential	With a large 18th-century modification.
John Bliss House		Newport	RI	1680	Residential	Early stone ender.
Chichester's Inn		Huntington	NY	1680	Tavern	
Old Ship Church		Hingham	MA	1681	Religious	Oldest church in continuous ecclesiastical use in the United States; only remaining 17th-century Puritan meeting house in America.
Hurd House		Woodbury	CT	1681	Residential	The older, north section, dates to around 1680 and was the home of John Hurd, who became the town's miller in 1681. The south section, which may have originally been the home of Hurd's son, was added to the older structure in 1718, to increase the overall size of the house.
Deacon John Graves House		Guilford	CT	1681	Residential	Saltbox saved from demolition and fully restored in 1983 by a private foundation, now a museum in Madison.
Cooper–Frost–Austin House		Cambridge	MA	1681	Residential	Oldest house in Cambridge, verified using dendrochronology in 2002.
Appleton-Taylor-Mansfield House		Saugus	MA	1681	Residential	Also known as the Appleton House. This was part of the Saugus Iron Works, which was a major industrial complex. It has been restored and is open to the public.
Winona		Bridgetown	VA	1681	Residential	The only known 17th-century house in the country, other than Bacon's Castle in Surry County, to have diagonally-placed triple-chimney stacks.
St. Luke's Church		Smithfield	VA	1682	Religious	Recent dendrochronology studies confirm the 1682 date of this National Historic Landmark.
Wall House		Cheltenham Township	PA	1682	Residential	Possibly the oldest stone house in Pennsylvania. Built for Richard Wall, the founder of Cheltenham Township.
Nathaniel Bonnell House		Elizabeth	NJ	1682	Residential	
Philipse Manor Hall		Yonkers	NY	1682	Residential	Oldest surviving structure in Westchester County.
Caleb Pusey House		Upland	PA	1683	Residential	Oldest English-built house in Pennsylvania; only extant building known to have been visited by William Penn. Completed in 1696.
William Pepperrell House		Kittery	ME	1683	Residential	One of the oldest houses in Maine.
Pierce House (Dorchester, Massachusetts)		Dorchester	MA	1683	Residential	One of the oldest houses in Boston. Dated using dendrochronology in 2002.
Gardner House		Brookline	MA	1683	Residential	Dated using dendrochronology in 2007.
Sgt. George Flint House		North Reading	MA	prior to 1684	Residential	The Sgt. George Flint House is owned by the North Reading Historical and Antiquarian Society, which also owns the Rev. Daniel Putnam House in North Reading (built in 1720).
John Ward House		Salem	MA	1684	Residential	The John Ward House is a National Historic Landmark at 132 Essex Street in Salem, Massachusetts, located in the Downtown Salem District and added to the National Register of Historic Places in 1968.
Boelson Cottage		Philadelphia	PA	1684	Residential	Built sometime between 1678 and 1684; oldest extant structure in Fairmount Park and possibly the oldest extant house in Philadelphia.
Third Haven Meeting House		Talbot County	MD	1684	Religious	Oldest Quaker meeting house in the United States.
Forge Farm		Warwick	RI	1684	Residential	Oldest part of house dates to 1684.
C. A. Nothnagle Log House		Gibbstown	NJ	1685	Residential	Purportedly the oldest surviving log house in the U.S. and one of the oldest houses in New Jersey.
Old Indian Meeting House		Mashpee	MA	1685	Religious	Oldest Native American church.
Belmont Hall		Smyrna	DE	1685 (earliest part)	Residential	Large Georgian addition built about 1753 by Thomas Collins, who would become the sixth governor of Delaware.
Goodspeed House		Barnstable	MA	1685	Residential	
Buckelew Mansion		Jamesburg	NJ	c. 1685	Residential	One room in the house dates to c. 1685, possibly oldest in Middlesex County. House was expanded, most recently in the 19th century, and is also known as Lakeview
Revell House		Burlington	NJ	1685	Residential	Oldest house in Burlington County.
Hermitage Church of Nuestra Señora de Valvanera of Coamo		Coamo	PR	1685	Religious	Brick masonry chapel from 1685. The church has been on U.S. territory since Puerto Rico was annexed in 1898.
Daggett House		Pawtucket	RI	1685	Residential	Oldest house in Pawtucket. Not tested yet using dendrochronology.
Foster's Castle		Tunstall, Virginia	VA	1685–1690	Residential	
Sign of the Bird in Hand		Newtown	PA	1686	Tavern	Originally a residence, then tavern with other uses. Oldest frame house still standing in Pennsylvania. Famous as the site of the 1778 Newtown Skirmish during which Loyalists killed 5 and captured 16 to acquire cloth being manufactured for use by General George Washington's troops at Valley Forge. Now a private residence.
Jethro Coffin House		Nantucket	MA	1686	Residential	Oldest house on Nantucket. It was declared a National Historic Landmark and listed on the National Register of Historic Places in 1968.
John Woodward House		Newton	MA	1686	Residential	Built by John Woodward in what is now the Waban neighborhood, this is one of the oldest homes in Newton. It is listed on the National Register of Historic Places.
William Murray House		Salem	MA	1688	Residential	A historic house at 39 Essex Street.
Old Halsey House		Southampton	NY	1688	Residential	Built by Thomas Halsey, an English pioneer, the house is now a museum.
Iglesia San Germán de Auxerre		San Germán	PR	1688	Religious	Located in the San Germán Historic District, this parish church was built in 1688. The church has been on U.S. territory since Puerto Rico was annexed in 1898.
Wilbor House		Little Compton	RI	1690	Residential	Added to the National Register of Historic Places in 2007, the house serves as the headquarters of the Little Compton Historical Society.
Criss Cross		New Kent	VA	1690	Residential	
Acadian House		Guilford	CT	c. 1690	Residential	The house gets its name after the Acadians who resided there following the 1755 Great Expulsion.
Farmar Mill		Fort Washington	PA	c. 1690	Mill	Oldest surviving mill in Pennsylvania.
Spencer–Peirce–Little Farm		Newbury	MA	c. 1690	Residential	One of the oldest stone buildings in New England, now a nonprofit museum.
Clemence–Irons House		Johnston	RI	1691	Residential	
Boardman House		Saugus	MA	1692	Residential	
Eleazer Arnold House		Lincoln	RI	1693	Residential	
Terry-Ketcham Inn		Center Moriches	NY	c. 1693	Residential/Tavern	Oldest portion c. 1693, with major expansions in 1710 and 1790, now a nonprofit museum.
Parker Tavern		Reading	MA	1694	Tavern	Parker Tavern is now a museum owned by the Reading Antiquarian Society.
Old Quaker Meeting House		Flushing, Queens	NY	1694	Religious	The only surviving example in New York State of a typical 17th-century ecclesiastical frame structure of medieval design.
Pink House		Charleston	SC	1694–1712	Residential	Built by John Breton in the city's French Quarter, the house is one of the oldest buildings in South Carolina and the oldest building in Charleston.
Abraham Browne House		Watertown	MA	c. 1694–1701	Residential	Built by Abraham Browne, the house is the oldest remaining in Watertown. It is owned by Historic New England and listed on the National Register of Historic Places.
Parson Capen House		Topsfield	MA	1694	Residential	The house was declared a National Historic Landmark in 1960. The Topsfield Historical Society currently operates it as a historic house museum. Date confirmed with Dendrochronology.
Paine-Dodge House		Ipswich	MA	1694	Residential	
Wren Building		Williamsburg	VA	1695	School	Oldest school building in America, original The College of William & Mary structure.
John Sherburne House		Portsmouth	NH	1695	Residential	
Castillo de San Marcos		St. Augustine	FL	1672–1695	Government	Oldest masonry fortification in the United States.
Comfort Starr House		Guilford	CT	1695	Residential	
Nelson–Galt House		Williamsburg	VA	1695	Residential	Oldest dwelling in Colonial Williamsburg
Joachim Staats House		Schodack	NY	1696	Residential	
Old Dutch Church of Sleepy Hollow		Sleepy Hollow	NY	1697	Religious	Oldest church in the State of New York.
Wanton–Lyman–Hazard House		Newport	RI	1697	Residential	
Dwight–Derby House		Medfield	MA	1697	Residential	
Grace Church		Yorktown	VA	1697	Religious	
Holy Trinity Church		Wilmington	DE	1698–99	Religious	Oldest Swedish church in the United States. The building was declared a National Historic Landmark in 1961.
Great Friends Meeting House		Newport	RI	1699	Religious	Expanded in 1730, 1807, 1857, and 1867 to accommodate the New England Yearly Meeting of Friends.
James Noyes House		Newbury	MA	1699	Residential	Reverend James Noyes left Wiltshire, England, with his brother, Nicholas Noyes and cousin, Thomas Parker, bound for the Massachusetts Bay Colony in the mid-1630s and built this house, which still stands, in 1646.
Hoyt-Barnum House		Stamford	CT	c. 1699	Residential	The builder was a descendant of one of the original founders of Stamford. The structure is owned and maintained as a museum by the Stamford Historical Society.
Middleburg Plantation		Huger	SC	c. 1699	Residential	Possibly the oldest building in South Carolina. It was a plantation built by a French Huguenot Benjamin Simons in 1699 on the Cooper River near Huger, South Carolina.
Old House		Cutchogue	NY	1699	Residential	One of the oldest houses in the state; previously thought to have been built in 1649. 2003 dendrochronology surveys yielded a date of 1699.
Dickinson–Pillsbury–Witham House		Georgetown	MA	c. 1700	Residential	The Dickinson–Pillsbury–Witham House was listed on the National Register of Historic Places in 1990.
Strawbery Banke		Portsmouth	NH	numerous structures – 17th–19th centuries	Residential and Industrial	Strawbery Banke is a collection of 37 historic buildings dating back to the 17th century.

== 18th century ==
Building	Image	Location	State	First built	Use	Notes
Dutch House		New Castle	DE	1700	Residential	Despite being called the Dutch House, the building style is more English.
Benoni Fox House		Concord	MA	1700	Residential	This is one of the oldest buildings of the Fox family in the United States.
Stanton–Davis Homestead Museum		Stonington	CT	1700	Farmhouse	The farm has been worked every year since 1654. Has not been verified with dendrochronology.
Gloria Dei (Old Swedes') Church		Philadelphia	PA	1700	Religious	Oldest surviving church in Philadelphia.
Edward Morgan Log House		Towamencin	PA	1700	Residential	Home to the maternal grandfather of Daniel Boone and Daniel Morgan
Harlow Old Fort House		Plymouth	MA	1700	Residential	Has not been verified with dendrochronology.
Mortonson–Van Leer Log Cabin		Swedesboro	NJ	1700 c.	Residential	Historic cabin and one of the last historical dwellings in Swedesboro.
The Hermitage		Virginia Beach	VA	1700	Residential	
Belle Air Plantation		Charles City County	VA	c. 1700	Residential	
John Weblin House		Virginia Beach	VA	c. 1700	Residential	
Old Powder House		Somerville	MA	1703	Windmill	Converted to the use of gunpowder storage in 1747 which was used during the American Revolutionary War.
St. Peter's Church		New Kent, Virginia	VA	1703	Religious	Church of Martha Washington, George and Martha Washington may have been married here
Union Oyster House		Boston	MA	c. 1704	Restaurant	Open to diners since 1826, it is among the oldest operating restaurants in the United States and the oldest known to have been continuously operating.
Brinton 1704 House		West Chester	PA	1704	Residential	One of the oldest houses in Pennsylvania. Built by a Quaker family. A National Historic Landmark and listed on the National Register of Historic Places.
Old St. Andrew's Parish Church		Charleston	SC	1706	Religious	Oldest church building in South Carolina.
Yeocomico Church		Tucker Hill, Virginia	VA	1706	Religious	
Wayside Inn Historic District		Sudbury	MA	1707	Residential/Tavern	Located on the Old Boston Post Road and made famous in a collection of poems by Henry Wadsworth Longfellow.
The Hosmer Homestead		Concord	MA	c. 1707–1710	Residential	The Hosmer Homestead, also known as the Hosmer/Baker Farm, is an historic house at 138 Baker Avenue in Concord, Massachusetts. The oldest portion of this 2 1/2-story wood-frame house was probably built c. 1707–1710 by Stephen Hosmer, based on architectural evidence. The property has a long association with the Hosmer family, who were early settlers of Concord and who have played a significant role in the growth and civic life of the town. The house interior has well-preserved Georgian woodwork and plaster.
McIntire Garrison House		York	ME	1707 or later	Residential/Military	Possibly the oldest building in Maine.
Jonathan Singletary Dunham House		Woodbridge Township	NJ	1709	Residential	
Buckman Tavern		Lexington	MA	1709–1710	Tavern	It played a prominent role in the Battle of Lexington and Concord in 1775. It was declared a National Historic Landmark and is listed on the National Register of Historic Places.
Capt. Jonathan Parker House		Reading	MA	ca 1710	Residential	Still a private residence at Charles and Pearl Sts.
Coronet John Farnum Jr. House	Cornet John Farnum, Jr., House - Uxbridge, Massachusetts - DSC02844	Uxbridge	MA	ca 1710	Residential	The Cornet John Farnum Jr. House was the site of the first Uxbridge Town Meeting in 1727. The house today is a museum and headquarters of the Uxbridge Historical Society. It is an excellent example of early New England colonial architecture.
Buttolph-Williams House		Wethersfield	CT	1711	Residential	One of the oldest surviving homes in Wethersfield, declared a National Historic Landmark in 1968.
Randall–Hale Homestead		Stow	MA	1710	Residential	The Randall–Hale Homestead is a historic First Period house at 6 Sudbury Road in Stow, Massachusetts. The oldest portion of this 2 1/2-story timber-frame house was built c. 1710. One of the oldest surviving homes in Stow, the house was listed on the National Register of Historic Places in 1996.
San Miguel Mission		Santa Fe	NM	1710	Government/religious	Said to be the oldest church structure built in the United States. The original adobe walls and altar were built by the Tlaxcalan of Mexico, but much of the structure was rebuilt in 1710. Building has been within the United States since the Mexican Cession of 1848.
Stephen Northup House		North Kingstown	RI	1712	Residential	possibly burned during King Philip's War in the 1670s and rebuilt, later modifications 1712, 1850, 2004
The Powder Magazine		Charleston	SC	1713	Government	Oldest public building in South Carolina. The Powder Magazine Museum.
Old State House		Boston	MA	1713	Government	Oldest surviving public building in Boston. The Bostonian Society Museum.
Hyland House Museum		Guilford	CT	ca. 1713	Residential	Open to the public since 1918. Listed on the National Register of Historic Places in 1976.
Perth Amboy City Hall		Perth Amboy	NJ	1714–1717	Government	Oldest city hall in US.
Samuel Chase House		West Newbury	MA	1715	Residential	A rare brick house of the period. A story passed down in the Chase family says that bricks for the house were made on the family's farm and carried to the job site by Hannah Chase in her apron.
Clough House		Boston	MA	1715	Residential	
Merion Friends Meeting House		Merion Station	PA	1715	Religious	One of the oldest Quaker meeting houses in America.
Bruton Parish Church		Williamsburg	VA	1715	Religious	
Colonial Inn		Concord	MA	1716	Commercial	Still an operating inn and restaurant.
Benjamin Flagg House		Worcester	MA	c. 1717	Residential	Built by Capt. Benjamin Flagg, it is the oldest remaining home in Worcester. It is listed on the National Register of Historic Places.
The Alamo		San Antonio	TX	1718	Religious	Part of the San Antonio Missions, listed as a UNESCO world heritage site. Site of the Battle of the Alamo.
Ware Parish Church		Gloucester	VA	1718	Religious	
Lane House		Edenton	NC	1718–19	Residential	Oldest house in North Carolina identified by dendrochronology.
Massachusetts Hall		Cambridge	MA	1718–1720	School	Oldest extant building at Harvard University.
Thomas Hastings House		Newton	MA	ca. 1719	Residential	
King of Prussia Inn		King of Prussia	PA	1719	Tavern	Granted its name to the town that grew up around it.
Adam Thoroughgood House		Virginia Beach	VA	1719	Residential	
Rev. Daniel Putnam House		North Reading	MA	1720	Residential	Headquarters of the North Reading Historical and Antiquarian Society. The society also owns the Sgt. George Flint House in North Reading, which was built prior to 1684.
Garretson Forge and Farm		Fair Lawn	NJ	1720	Residential	One of the oldest homes in Bergen County, New Jersey.
Bray House		Kittery Point	ME	c. 1720	Residential	Built on the site of an earlier structure built in c. 1662, it is among the oldest houses in Maine.
Jonathan Green House		Stoneham	MA	c. 1720	Residential	It is one of the oldest structures in Stoneham. It is listed on the National Register of Historic Places.
Wayside Cottage		Scarsdale	NY	c. 1720	Residential	One of the oldest houses in Westchester County, New York. Owned and operated by the Junior League of Central Westchester.
Thomas Wheeler House		Bridgeport	CT	1720	Residential	Other sources suggest the core was constructed in 1644, and expanded 1680, oldest house in Bridgeport Black Rock Harbor, residence.
William Penn Guest House		New Castle	DE	c. 1720	Residential	Oldest buildings in New Castle. Purportedly where William Penn lodged after first arrival in America.
Jonathan Young Windmill		Orleans	MA	1720	Industrial	The Jonathan Young Windmill is a restored, working early eighteenth-century windmill with its original machinery intact, located next to Town Cove in Orleans.
Strode's Mill		West Chester	PA	c. 1721	Industrial/Residential	A fieldstone gristmill that is currently a residence.
John Adams Birthplace		Quincy	MA	1722	Farmhouse	Oldest existing building within which a future president of the United States was born (John Adams, October 30, 1735)
Bull Stone House		Hamptonburgh	NY	c. 1722	Residential	One of the oldest houses in Orange County, New York. Built by early settlers William Bull and Sarah Wells; continuously owned by Bull family descendants.
Brafferton Building		Williamsburg	VA	1723	School	Opened in 1723 as the Indian school for the College of William & Mary, restored in 1930–31, now serving as the president and provost office
González–Alvarez House		St. Augustine	FL	c. 1723	Residential	Probably constructed between 1723 and 1790. Oldest house in St. Augustine, the oldest continuously occupied city in the continental United States.
Block House		Claymont	DE	1723	Residential	One of the oldest structures in Delaware.
Bellingham–Cary House		Chelsea	MA	1724	Residential	The Bellingham–Cary House is an historic house museum at 34 Parker Street in Chelsea, Massachusetts. The building, now a Federal style mansion, incorporates in its structure the 1659 hunting lodge of colonial governor Richard Bellingham, and is the only surviving 18th-century building in the city. It was listed on the National Register of Historic Places in 1974.
Chester Courthouse		Chester	PA	1724	Government	Oldest public building in Pennsylvania. Served as Chester County Courthouse from 1724 until 1795, the Delaware County Courthouse from 1795 until 1850, and Chester Borough/City Hall from then until sometime in the 20th century. It was listed on the National Register of Historic Places in 1971.
Parish Church of St. Helena		Beaufort, South Carolina	SC	1724	Religious	
Alamo Mission Long Barracks		San Antonio	TX	c. 1724	Religious	The Alamo Chapel and Priests quarters and convent (Long Barracks) in San Antonio. In the center of the surrounding area are the remains of the "Long Barracks" which were constructed 20 years before the chapel. Founded in 1718 and moved to present site 1724.
Reuben Brown House		Concord	MA	1725	Residential	Built in 1725 by the town saddler, Reuben Brown. There is also a strong tradition that the house was the home of Peter Bulkeley, which is why the house is often referred to as the Peter Bulkeley / Reuben Brown House. The evidence is still unclear whether or not the Bulkeleys did build the house some 300 years ago. What historians can conclude, however, is that the house was either completely updated or built by Reuben Brown in 1725, since most of the house's present features are typical of houses from 1700 to 1730.
Fort Niagara		Youngstown	NY	1726	Fortification	Built in 1726 by the French as a "house of peace". Taken by the British in 1759, the fledgling United States regained control by treaty in 1796. It was lost to the British in 1813, but was relinquished as a result of the Treaty of Ghent, and has remained in the hands of the United States ever since.
James Smith House		Needham	MA	1727–1728	Residential	The house was built by James Smith, a recent Irish immigrant. His son, Captain Robert Smith, who commanded one of the militia companies from Needham engaged in the fighting the day of the Battle of Concord Bridge, may have been born and lived here.
48 Hudson Avenue		Albany	NY	1728	Residential	Oldest stand-alone structure in Albany.
Lent Homestead and Cemetery		East Elmhurst	NY	1729	Residential	Oldest occupied residential structure in Queens, New York. Has not been verified with dendrochronology.
Espíritu Santo y San Patricio Parish Church		Loíza	PR	1729	Religious	This parish church was built in 1729. The church has been on U.S. territory since Puerto Rico was annexed in 1898.
Church Nuestra Señora de la Candelaria y San Matías of Manatí		Manatí	PR	1729	Religious	Built in 1729 and underwent major repairs in 1864. The church has been on U.S. territory since Puerto Rico was annexed in 1898.
John Cowan House		Charleston	SC	1729-1730	Residential	One of earliest datable dwellings outside the former walled city of Charleston.
Hampton Plantation		McClellanville	SC	1730	Residential	Historic Southern plantation house. Now state historic park.
Newbold–White House		Hertford	NC	1730	Residential	Oldest brick house in North Carolina.
Williams House, Historic Deerfield		Deerfield	MA	c. 1730	Residential	One of the oldest houses in Old Deerfield, although extensively remodeled in the 19th century. The original area of Deerfield has been preserved and is listed on the National Register of Historic Places.
Mission Concepcion		San Antonio	TX	1731	Religious	Part of the San Antonio Missions; listed as a UNESCO world heritage site.
Mission San Juan Capistrano		San Antonio	TX	1731	Religious	Part of the San Antonio Missions; listed as a UNESCO world heritage site.
Ephrata Cloister		Lancaster County	PA	1732	Religious	Last surviving resident of the Ephrata Cloister religious community died on July 27, 2008, at the age of 98.
Pratt House		Essex	CT	1732	Residential	
Nehemiah Royce House		Wallingford	CT	1734	Residential	A typical saltbox, this house was visited by George Washington in 1775.
Quackenbush House		Albany	NY	1736	Residential	Listed on the National Register of Historic Places. As of 2024, was the location of the Olde English Pub.
Nuestra Señora de las Mercedes de San Miguel de Hato Grande		San Lorenzo	PR	1737	Religious	Also known as Las Mercedes Church, this Classical Revival style building was built in 1737. The church has been on U.S. territory since Puerto Rico was annexed in 1898.
San Fernando Cathedral		San Antonio	TX	1738–1750	Religious	One of the oldest Cathedrals in the United States; the oldest Cathedral in Texas. Listed on the National Register of historic places.
Mitchell–Anderson House		Wilmington	NC	1738	Residential	
339 Beechwood St.		Cohasset	MA	1739	Residential	Still a private residence. The story passed down is that the large buttonwood tree in front of the house was planted on the day one of the sons in the family marched off to go fight in the Revolutionary War.
Old Cahokia Courthouse		Cahokia	IL	1740	Government	One of the oldest French Colonial Poteaux-sur-solle style buildings in Illinois.
Oxford Furnace		Oxford Township	NJ	1741	Furnace	First hot blast furnace in the United States.
St. John's Episcopal Church, Richmond, Va.		Richmond, Virginia	VA	1741	Religious	Site of Patrick Henry's "give me liberty or give me death!" speech with George Washington and Thomas Jefferson among other notables in attendance.
Fort Matanzas		St. Johns County	FL	1740–1742	Presidio	Designated a United States National Monument on October 15, 1924.
Amos Chase House		Saco	ME	c. 1743	Residential	Oldest building in Saco. It was actually two houses, one of which was brought over on logs used as rollers, and joined to the other by the industrious Amos Chase to accommodate his large family.
Mission Espada		San Antonio	TX	1745	Religious	Part of the San Antonio Missions; listed as a UNESCO world heritage site. Founded 1690; building current building constructed in 1745
Old Ursuline Convent		New Orleans	LA	1748 (or 1752)	Religious	Considered the oldest building in Louisiana, and perhaps the oldest building in the Mississippi River Valley
Spanish Governor's Palace		San Antonio	TX	1749	Government	One of the oldest government buildings in Texas. Now open as a museum.
Presidio La Bahía		Goliad	TX	1749	Presidio	The best preserved Spanish presidio in the United States.
Deacon Thomas Kendall House		Wakefield	MA	prior to 1750	Residential	Deacon Thomas Kendall was among the earliest settlers of the area, and an influential member of the community, serving as a selectman, commissioner, and deacon of the church for 36 years. He and his wife, Rebecca, had 10 children, and when she died, at the age of 85, she had 175 grandchildren and great-grandchildren.
Danish West India and Guinea Company Warehouse		Christiansted	VI	1750	Commercial	Built as a trading center for the Danish on the island of St. Croix. Has been on US soil since the 1917 purchase of the Virgin Islands from Denmark.
The Brown House, 209 Ashby Rd		New Ipswich	NH	1750	Residential	Still a private residence, the house was built by Josiah Brown out of American chestnut, and is still surrounded by old varietals of roses and hydrangeas. Its construction date is recorded in a book held by the New Ipswich historical society.
Mayfield		Dinwiddie	VA	1750	Residential	Moved from its original location a mile or so away, this is the oldest brick home in Dinwiddie county.
Parlange Plantation House		Mix	LA	1750	Plantation	One of the oldest plantation homes in the South and perhaps the oldest building in the Mississippi Valley
Mount Holly Firehouse		Mount Holly	NJ	1752	Firehouse	Oldest firehouse in the United States, established by what is now the country's oldest continuously operating volunteer fire department.
Fort de Chartres Powder Magazine		Prairie du Rocher	IL	1753–1756	Government	Oldest building in Illinois.
Pirates' House		Savannah	GA	c. 1754	Mix	Possibly the oldest building in Georgia, and the oldest building in the city of Savannah.
Josiah Day House		West Springfield	MA	c. 1754	Residential	It is believed to be the oldest known brick saltbox style house in the U.S. The home is listed on the National Register of Historic Places.
Fort William Henry		Lake George	NY	1755	Military	Built during the French and Indian War, it was featured in James Fenimore Cooper's novel, The Last of the Mohicans.
LaPointe–Krebs House		Pascagoula	MS	1757	Mix	The oldest building in Mississippi, this French colonial structure is one of the oldest buildings on the Gulf Coast of the United States.
DuBois-Boatwright House		Wilmington	NC	1760	Residential	
General Rufus Putnam House		Rutland	MA	1760–1765	Residential	Rufus Putnam was a Revolutionary War general and later instrumental in the founding of Ohio. His home is now a B&B.
Derby House		Salem	MA	1762	Residential	Capt. Richard Derby was the first millionaire in America. The home is now part of Salem Maritime National Historic Site. The site has 12 historic structures, including the Customs House, and a replica of the sailing ship Friendship of Salem.
Elihu Akin House		Dartmouth	MA	1762	Residential	Home of the Akin family, a colonial family instrumental in the American Revolutionary War in Southeastern Massachusetts.
Proprietary House		Perth Amboy	NJ	1762	Government	Oldest remaining colonial proprietary governor's residence in the original Thirteen States.
Touro Synagogue		Newport	RI	1763	Religious	Oldest synagogue building in the United States.
Fort Pitt Blockhouse		Pittsburgh	PA	1764	Defense	Oldest structure in Pittsburgh. One of the oldest colonial structures west of the Allegheny Mountains.
Sandy Hook Light		Sandy Hook	NJ	1764	Lighthouse	Oldest original lighthouse in the United States.
Old Stone House (Washington, D.C.)		Washington, D.C.	DC	1765	Residential	Oldest unchanged building in Washington, D.C.
St. John's Episcopal Church		Fort Washington	MD	1767	Religious	Located in the Broad Creek Historic District. The building is the 4th iteration of the church since the original was erected in 1695.
Mission San Jose		San Antonio	TX	1768–1782	Religious	Part of the San Antonio Missions; listed as a UNESCO world heritage site.
Harmony Hall		Fort Washington	MD	1769	Residential	Located in the Broad Creek Historic District. It was originally known as Battersea, and overlooked the colonial port of Aire.
William Henry House		Bennington	VT	1769	Residential	
Burgwin-Wright House		Wilmington	NC	1770	Residential	
University Hall (Brown University)		Providence	RI	1770	School	Oldest extant building at Brown University
DeFreest Homestead		North Greenbush, New York	NY	1771	Residential	Early Homested in Troy, New York
Cameron–Dixon House		Wilmington	NC	1771	Residential	
Mission San Luis Obispo de Tolosa		San Luis Obispo	CA	1772		
Maryland State House		Annapolis	MD	1772	Government	Oldest state house in continuous use in the United States.
Josiah Bartlett House		Kingston	NH	1774	Residential	Josiah Bartlett was a medical doctor, Governor of New Hampshire, and a signer of the Declaration of Independence.
Humphrey Bradstreet Farm		Rowley	MA	c. 1774	Residential	The Humphrey Bradstreet Farm is the second-oldest continuously operating farm in the United States. Humphrey Bradstreet was granted the property in 1635 by King Charles I, and it stayed in the Bradstreet family for the next 372 years, until purchased by the town of Rowley.
Brown-Lord House		Wilmington	NC	1775	Residential	
Mission San Juan Capistrano		San Juan Capistrano	CA	1776	Mission	Oldest surviving building in California. Restored.
Tank Cottage		Allouez	WI	1776	Residential	Oldest extant building in Wisconsin. Voyageur Joseph Roi built the cottage using the pièce-sur-pièce à coulisse technique, which was once common in French-Canadian architecture.
Fuller–Bemis House		Waltham	MA	c. 1776	Residential	One of the oldest surviving homes in Waltham. It is listed on the National Register of Historic Places.
Christopher Taylor House		Jonesborough	TN	1778	Residential	Possibly the oldest building in Tennessee, along with The Carter Mansion.
Fort Putnam		West Point	NY	1778	Military	Ft. Putnam was built by the regiment of Rufus Putnam during the Revolutionary War to guard the Hudson River. It is now part of the U.S. Military Academy at West Point.
Old Talbott Tavern		Bardstown	KY	1779	Tavern	Likely the oldest building in Kentucky and the "oldest western stagecoach stop" still in operation.
Officer's Stone Quarters		Fort Mackinac	MI	1780	Military	Oldest building in Michigan.
Hessian Barracks		Frederick	MD	c. 1780	Military	Possibly dating back to the French and Indian Wars (1754–1763), used as barracks for Hessian mercenaries during the American Revolutionary War. On the grounds of the Maryland School for the Deaf.
McGulpin House		Mackinac Island	MI	c. 1780	Residential	Oldest residential home in Michigan. Built in French Canadian style.
Biddle House (Mackinac Island)		Mackinac Island	MI	c. 1780	Commercial	House built for the fur trade in New France.
Morven Park		Leesburg	VA	c. 1780	Residential	Home of Virginia Governor Westmoreland Davis. The earliest parts of the structure were built circa 1780 and the building was significantly expanded in the decades that followed. It is listed on the National Register of Historic Places.
Harrison-Smith House		Bardstown	KY	c.1780 - 1795	Residential	Original section possibly the "oldest stone house in Kentucky"
Findowrie		Albemarle	VA	c. 1782	Residential	
Peirce–Nichols House		Salem	MA	1782	Residential	Owned by the Peabody Essex Museum
Castillo San Cristóbal		Old San Juan	PR	1783	Government	Built by the Spanish to protect against land-based attacks on the city of San Juan. Part of San Juan National Historic Site.
Dyckman House		Inwood, Manhattan	NY	1784	Residential	Only remaining original farmhouse in Manhattan
Rehoboth Church		Union	WV	1785	Religious	Oldest extant church in West Virginia
Church of the Holy Family (Cahokia, Illinois)		Cahokia	IL	1786	Religious	One of the few surviving French colonial buildings in Illinois. Oldest continuously active Catholic parish in the United States, and oldest church west of the Allegheny Mountains.
William Whitley House		Crab Orchard	KY	1787	Residential	"Oldest brick house in Kentucky," Some sources suggest it was built earlier. Its construction was preceded by that of Sportsman's Hill, "the first horse racing track west of the Appalachians."
Rufus Putnam House and Campus Martius (Ohio)		Marietta	OH	1788	Residential/military	Gen. Rufus Putnam's house was built as part of the Campus Martius fort. It is now part of the Campus Martius Museum.
Navarre–Anderson Trading Post		Frenchtown	MI	1789	Commercial/residential	Historic French homestead/trading post near present-day Monroe, Michigan.
Cameron-Hollman House		Wilmington	NC	1790	Residential	
Historic Locust Grove		Louisville	KY	1790	Residential	One of the oldest buildings in Kentucky (built years after the Old Talbott Tavern among others.) In close competition with Old Providence Church, Hawkins House, Jacob Eversole Cabin, John Andrew Miller House, Millspring, and the Zachary Taylor House among others.
Carpenter House		Rehoboth	MA	c. 1789	Residential	Built by Thomas Carpenter III circa 1789 using older materials from a building that was already on the site. The home is listed on the National Register of Historic Places.
Martin–Boismenue House		East Carondelet	IL	1790	Residential	One of the oldest surviving French Colonial structures in Illinois.
Mission Dolores		San Francisco, California	CA	1791	Religious	The oldest building in San Francisco and the oldest intact California Mission.
Ohio Company Land Office		Marietta	OH	1791	Commercial	The oldest building in Ohio.
Stone–Tolan House		Brighton	NY	c. 1792	Residential	A Federal-style structure said to be the oldest surviving building in Monroe County.
Blount Mansion		Knoxville	TN	1792	Residential/Government	The mansion served as the de facto capitol of the Southwest Territory. In 1796, much of the Tennessee Constitution was drafted in Governor Blount's office at the mansion.
Louis Bolduc House		Ste. Geneviève	MO	1788	Residential	The oldest building in Missouri.
White House		Washington, D.C.	DC	1792–1800	Government	The official residence of the president of the United States, and seat of the executive branch of the U.S federal government
United States Capitol		Washington, D.C.	DC	1793–1800	Government	Location of U.S. Congress, and seat of the legislative branch of the U.S. federal government.
Melrose on the Cane (Melrose Plantation)		Natchez	LA	1790	Residential	One of the largest plantations in the United States built by and for free people of color. The land was granted to Louis Metoyer (1790), with the "Big House" finished in 1832.
Mission San Xavier del Bac		Tohono O’odham San Xavier Indian Reservation	AZ	1797	Mission	Oldest European structure in Arizona.
Cathedral Basilica of St. Augustine		St. Augustine, Florida	FL	1798	Religious	The Cathedral Basilica of St. Augustine is the first parish in North America and is located in St. Augustine Florida. It is the seat of the Catholic Bishop of St. Augustine. The existing structure was constructed over five years (1793–1797) and was designated a U.S. National Historic Landmark on April 15, 2021.
Molalla Log House		Molalla	OR	1799–1813	Residential/military	This is the oldest building in Oregon and is believed to have been constructed by fur traders of French Canadian and/or Native American ancestry. The next closest contenders are the Methodist Mission Parsonage c.1841, the Jason Lee House c.1841, the Delaney-Edwards House c.1845, the John McLoughlin House c.1846, and the John D. Boon House c. 1846
Mission San Diego de Alcalá		San Diego	CA	1769	Mission/Military	The first Franciscan mission in The Californias. Ruined in the mid-1800s and restored by 1941.

== 19th/20th century ==
Building	Image	Location	State	First built	Use	Notes
Fort Nuestra Señora de la Soledad		Umatac	GU	1802–1819	Military	Built by the Spanish Empire, and was used to protect the trade route of the Manila Galleons between Acapulco, New Spain, and Manila, Spanish East Indies. Fort has been on US soil since the Spanish–American War, when Guam was annexed along with Puerto Rico.
Grouseland		Vincennes	IN	1804	Residential	Possibly the oldest building in Indiana. It is in close competition with the Indiana Territorial Capitol.
Joel Eddins House		Huntsville	AL	1808	Residential	The oldest documented building in Alabama.
Nicholas Jarrot Mansion		Cahokia	IL	1810	Residential	Mansion built by French colonialists in the Illinois Country. Extremely rare example of Federal architecture in the upper Mississippi River valley.
Kodiak Museum		Kodiak	AK	c. 1810	Commercial	The oldest building in Alaska. It was built as a storage facility by the Russian American Company.
Francois Vertefeuille House		Prairie du Chien	WI	c. 1810	Residential	Oldest building in Wisconsin still located at its original site. Built by French-Canadian fur traders using the pièce-sur-pièce à coulisse technique between 1810 and 1820.
Henry Cunningham House		Savannah	GA	1810	Residential	Oldest building in Savannah constructed for a person of color. Built for Reverend Henry Cunningham, founder of the Second African Baptist Church. Part of the Savannah Historic District.
Fort Howard		Allouez	WI	1816	Military	Oldest extant U.S. Armed Forces fort in Wisconsin, built in 1816 in the aftermath of the War of 1812.
Russian Fort Elizabeth		Waimea	HI	1817	Military	Fort built by the Russian-American Company to protect Russian interests in the Pacific.
Ka Hale Lāʻau		Honolulu	HI	1820	Residential	The oldest standing structure in Hawaii. It was shipped ready-made for assembly from Boston and used as a communal home by Christian missionaries.
Fort Snelling Round Tower		Hennepin County	MN	1820–1824	Military	The oldest building in Minnesota.
Marblehead Light		Marblehead	OH	1822	Government	Oldest lighthouse on the American coasts of the Great Lakes. It is listed on the National Register of Historic Places.
Woodruff Print Shop		Little Rock	AR	1824	Commercial	The oldest building in the state of Arkansas.
Alejandro Tapia y Rivera Theater		Old San Juan	PR	1824	Theatre	Oldest free-standing theater in San Juan and one of the oldest theaters in the Caribbean.
Charles Trowbridge House		Detroit	MI	1826	Residential	Oldest documented building in the city of Detroit.
The Basilica of Saint Mary		Alexandria_Virginia	VA	1826	Religious	The oldest Catholic parish in the Commonwealth of Virginia.
Old Customhouse (Monterey, California)		Monterey	CA	1827	Government	The oldest government building in present-day California, and one of the oldest in the western United States. Built by Mexico then won and operated by United States until it was transferred to the State of California in 1901.
Fort Leavenworth 'The Rookery'		Leavenworth	KS	1829	Military	The oldest building in Kansas.
Fort Gratiot Light		Port Huron	MI	1829	Lighthouse	First lighthouse in Michigan.
Louis Arriandeaux Log House		Dubuque	IA	1833	Residential	The oldest building in Iowa.
St. Thomas Synagogue		Charlotte Amalie	VI	1833	Religious	Second oldest synagogue in on US soil, and has the longest continuous use as a Jewish congregation in the nation. Has been on US soil since the 1917 purchase of the Virgin Islands from Denmark.
Rancho Petaluma Adobe		Petaluma	CA	1835–1857	Residential/military	This large adobe ranch house was built by Colonel Mariano Guadalupe Vallejo, Commandante General of the "Free State of Alta California" (Northern California). Now known as the Petaluma Adobe State Historic Park, it is owned by the State of California and listed on the National Register of Historic Places.
Log Cabin		Bellevue	NE	c. 1835	Residential	The oldest building in Nebraska. It originally served as a fur trapper's home.
Larkin House		Monterey	CA	1835	Residential	Oldest two-story house in California. The nearby Cooper-Molera Adobe was also built circa the same period.
Rotchev House		Fort Ross	CA	1836	Residential	Oldest Russian building in California.
Henry B. Clarke House		Chicago, Illinois	IL	1836	Residential	Oldest building in Chicago
La Princesa Prison		Old San Juan	PR	1837	Prison	Oldest purpose-built prison in Puerto Rico.
Hulihee Palace		Kailua, Kona	HI	1838	Residential	Originally built by John Adams Kuakini, it was later acquired by Princess Ruth Keʻelikōlani and used as a vacation home for Hawaiian royalty.
Old Courthouse (St. Louis)		Saint Louis	MO	1839–1864	Government	Oldest federal building built for the United States west of the Mississippi River.
Fort Gibson Barracks		Fort Gibson	OK	c. 1840	Military	The oldest building in Oklahoma (formerly the Indian Territory). In close competition with the Cherokee National Supreme Court building.
Ponce City Hall		Ponce	PR	1840	Government	Oldest purpose-built city hall in Puerto Rico and oldest surviving building Ponce.
Kawaiahaʻo Church		Honolulu	HI	1842	Religious	Oldest surviving church on Oahu. Formerly the national church of the Hawaiian Kingdom and chapel of the royal family. Designated a U.S. National Historic Landmark (NHL) in 1962.
Punahou School		Honolulu	HI	1842	Educational	Punahou was founded in 1841 for the children of Christian missionaries and is the oldest formal English language school west of the Rocky Mountains.
United States Customs House in Ponce		Ponce	PR	1842	Government	Oldest U.S. customs house in Puerto Rico. Possibly also the oldest purpose-built post office in Puerto Rico.
Ponce de León Family House		San Germán	PR	1842	Residential	Allegedly the oldest continuously occupied home in Puerto Rico; home to Ponce De Leon family. Located in San Germán Historic District. The house has been on U.S. territory since Puerto Rico was annexed in 1898.
Kittson Trading Post		Walhalla	ND	1843	Commercial	The oldest building in North Dakota. It was constructed by an agent of the American Fur Company.
Fort Nisqually Granary		Tacoma	WA	1843	Military	Oldest building in Washington State. In competition with the circa 1837–1844 Prince's Cabin at the Frenchtown Historic Site in Walla Walla, Washington.
Benjamin Church House		Shorewood	WI	1843–1844	Residential	The oldest extant house in Milwaukee, Wisconsin.
Old Fort Benton Blockhouse		Fort Benton	MT	1844	Military	The oldest building in Montana. It was the last fur trading post on the Upper Missouri River and the terminus of the Mullan Road, the overland route that linked the Missouri and Columbia Rivers.
Wheelock Church		Millerton	OK	1845	Religious	Oldest surviving church in Oklahoma. Formerly the principal congregation of the Choctaw Nation. Added to the National Register of Historic Places (NRHP) in 1972.
Castillo San Felipe del Morro Lighthouse		San Juan	PR	1846–1908	Lighthouse	First lighthouse built in Puerto Rico. Rebuilt and remodeled over several decades until the U.S. government rebuilt it after annexing Puerto Rico.
Robert Gardner Jr. House		Millcreek	UT	1848	House	It is likely the oldest standing European American structure in the state of Utah, dating to the year of the Mexican Cession of the Alta California region to the United States following the Mexican–American War
Fort Laramie 'Old Bedlam' Building		Torrington	WY	1849	Military	Oldest documented building still standing in Wyoming. It served as a major fur trading post and diplomatic site during the 19th century.
Cataldo Mission		Cataldo	ID	1853	Mission	Oldest standing building in Idaho.
Fagalele Boys School		Leone, American Samoa	AS	1850–1856	Education	Church school built by the London Missionary Society. First school to be built in what is now American Samoa, and possibly the oldest surviving building in the territory.
Old Las Vegas Mormon Fort		Las Vegas, Nevada	NV	1855	Military	The oldest American structure in Nevada.
Fort Garland Officer's Quarters and Barracks		Fort Garland	CO	1858	Military	The oldest American buildings still standing in Colorado. In close competition with Four Mile House c. 1859.
Fort Sisseton		Britton	SD	1864	Military	The oldest structures still standing in South Dakota.
Pioneer Courthouse		Portland	OR	1869–1903	Government	Oldest federal building in the Pacific Northwest.
Auditorium Building		Chicago	IL	1889	Theatre	One of the first Chicago skyscrapers built. Currently owned by Roosevelt University.
Manhattan Building (Chicago, Illinois)		Chicago	IL	1889–1891	Commercial	Oldest surviving skyscraper in the world. Currently residential condominiums.

== See also ==
- List of oldest buildings in the Americas
- List of burial mounds in the United States
- List of the oldest churches in the United States
- List of the oldest synagogues in the United States
