= Glenwood culture =

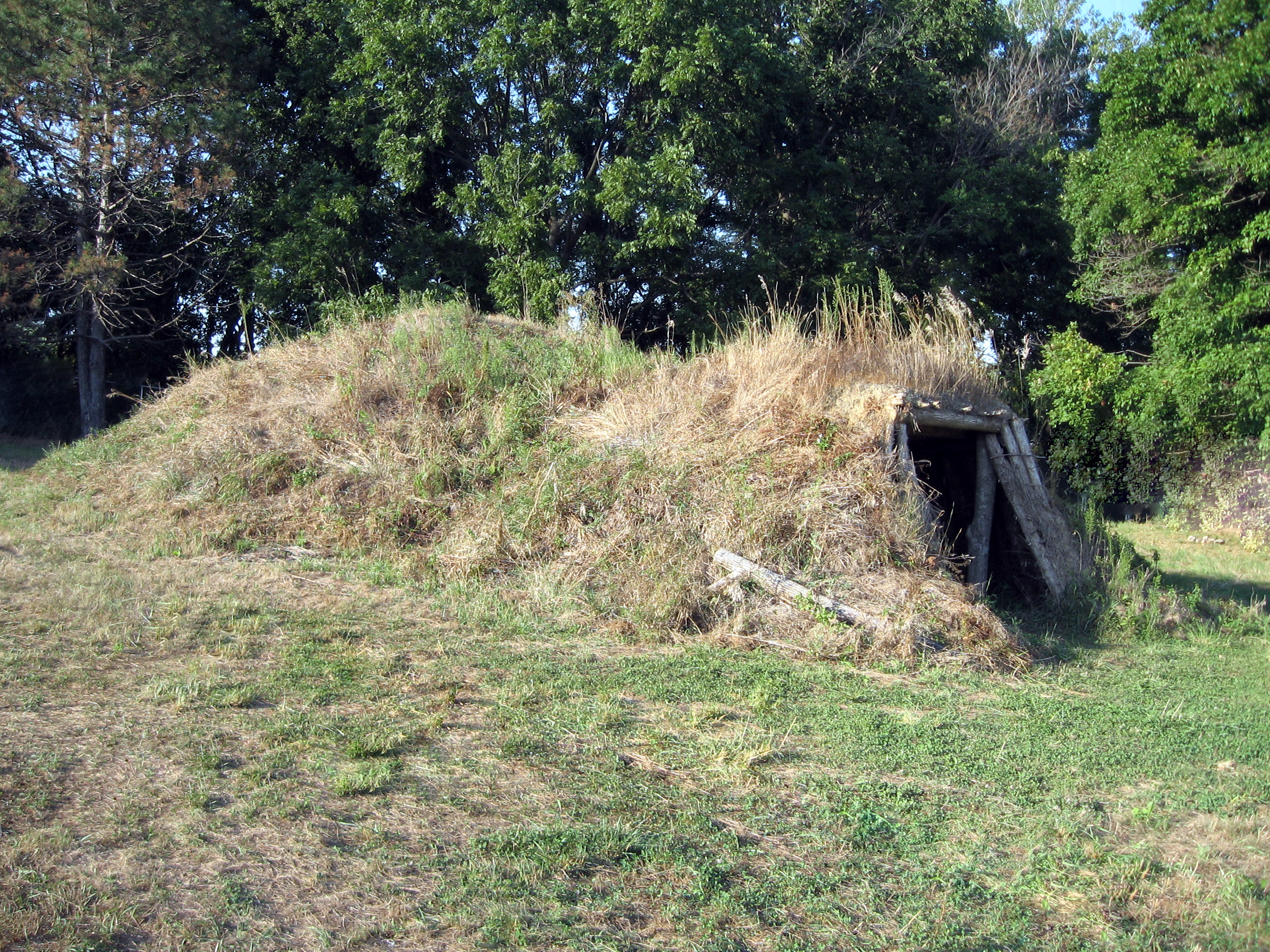
Reconstructed Glenwood earthlodge, Glenwood, Iowa.

The Glenwood Culture was a population of Indigenous peoples of North America prior to historical times. The culture is recognized as an eastern extension of the Nebraska Phase of the Woodland period, and was not a Mississippian culture.

== Culture ==
The Glenwood culture lived in Iowa and eastern Nebraska from roughly 900 A.D. to 1300 A.D. and built hundreds of earth lodges in the region, farming the rich valley bottoms and cultivating native plants from the surrounding hills.

Glenwood sites in southwest Iowa near the Missouri River appear to be unrelated to the earlier Great Oasis sites, and are notable for their large earthlodge sites. Glenwood sites appear to have been more oriented in lifeways and trade with the Central Plains tradition cultures to the west than with the Mississippian cultures to the southeast.

Around 1300 AD Mill Creek and Glenwood sites in Iowa disappeared, replaced by the rapidly spreading Oneota cultures.

== Archaeology ==
An earth lodge replica has been reconstructed in the Glenwood (Iowa) Lake Park, and the Mills County Museum, also located at the park, houses an excellent collection of artifacts collected by renowned amateur archeologist Paul Rowe. Two archaeological sites in Iowa from the Glenwood culture are listed on the National Register of Historic Places: Glenwood Archeological District and the West Oak Forest Earthlodge Site.

== See also ==
- History of Nebraska
- History of Iowa
