= Billiou–Stillwell–Perine House =

Historic house in Staten Island, New York

- U.S. National Register of Historic Places
- New York City Landmark
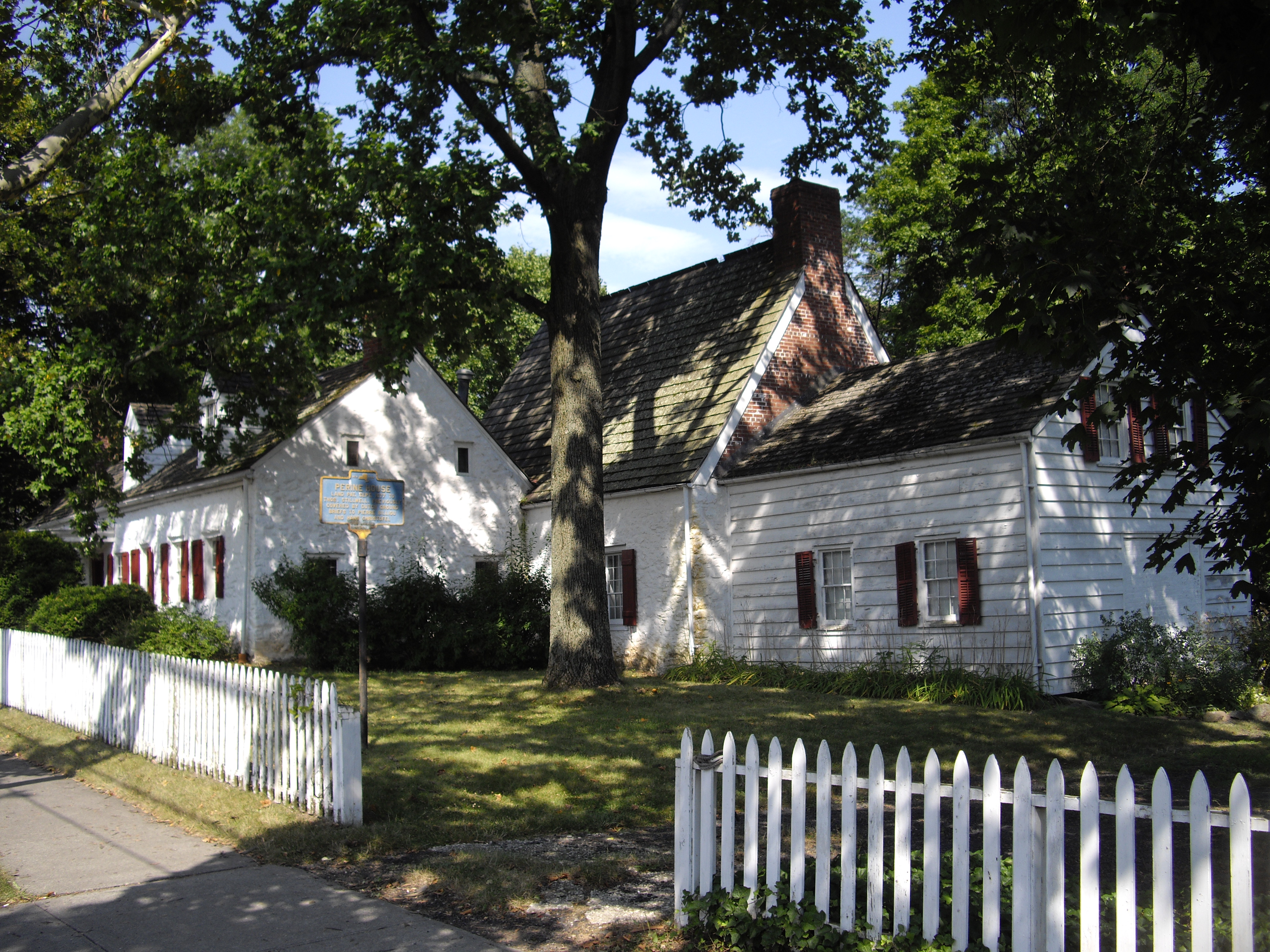
- Billiou–Stillwell–Perine House

- Location within New York City Location within New York Location within the United States
- Location: 1476 Richmond Road, Staten Island, New York
- Coordinates: 40°35′34″N 74°6′3″W
- Built: ca. 1662
- Architectural style: Domestic vernacular
- NRHP reference No.: 76001269
- NYCL No.: 0380

Significant dates
- Added to NRHP: January 1, 1976
- Designated NYCL: February 28, 1967

The Billiou–Stillwell–Perine House is a Dutch Colonial structure and the oldest standing building on Staten Island, New York.

== History ==
The house was originally built by Pierre Billiou, a Huguenot who arrived at New Amsterdam fleeing religious persecution in Europe in 1661. He founded Oude Dorp (Old Town) in the same year, and subsequently received a land grant on Staten Island, erecting the original stone section of the house around 1662. His daughter Martha (1652–1736) inherited the property and resided there with her husband, Thomas Stillwell (1651–1704/1705), and later with her second husband, Rev. David de Bonrepos (1654–1734), whom she married in 1711.

About 1680, Thomas Stillwell, a well-to-do landowner, enlarged the house. The house underwent to additional expansions through 1830. Stillwell and Martha's descendants, the Brittons, owned it until the mid-18th century. It was then acquired in 1758 by Edward Perine, whose family owned it until 1913. The Staten Island Antiquarian Society obtained the Billiou–Stillwell–Perine House in 1915, and the Staten Island Historical Society obtained the house in 1922, following a merger with the Antiquarian Society.

The building has a shingled sloping roof, a high jambless fireplace with a large stone hearth, and a ceiling with exceptionally large beams. Owned by Historic Richmond Town, the house is occasionally open to the public on a limited schedule or by appointment. The roof was restored in 2013. In September 2025, the house received a $500,000 grant to pay for repairs.

== See also ==
- List of the oldest buildings in the United States
- List of the oldest buildings in New York
- List of New York City Designated Landmarks in Staten Island
- National Register of Historic Places listings in Richmond County, New York
