= Glenwood Archeological District =

Historic district in Iowa, United States

- U.S. National Register of Historic Places
- U.S. Historic district
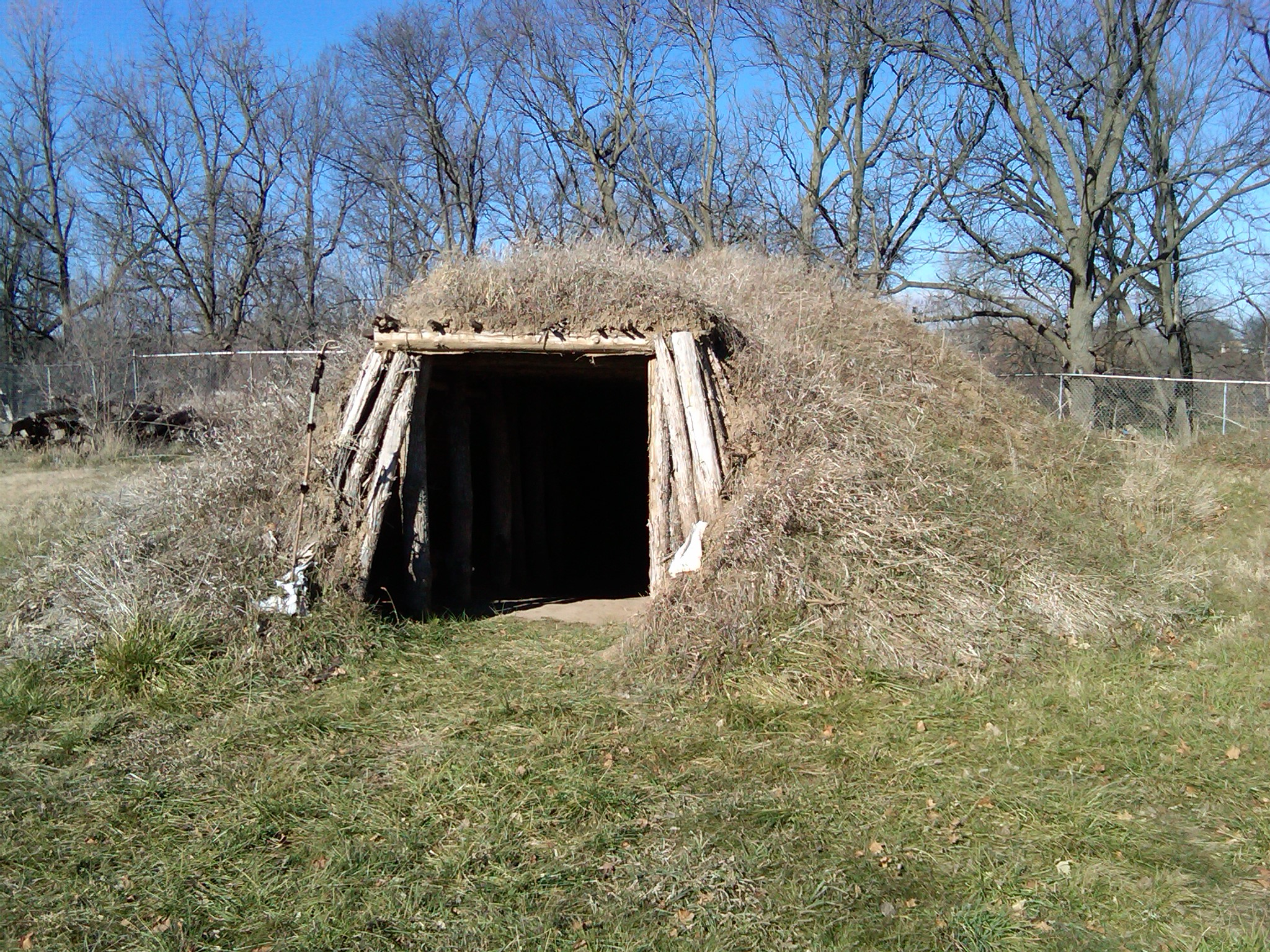
- Reconstruction of an earth lodge
- Nearest city: Glenwood, Iowa
- MPS: Archeological Resources of the Central Plains Tradition in the Loess Hills Region of Iowa MPS
- NRHP reference No.: 13000296
- Added to NRHP: May 22, 2013

The Glenwood Archeological District is a nationally recognized historic district and archaeological sites located near Glenwood, Iowa, United States. It is one of nine sites from the Nebraska Phase of the Woodland period recognized by archaeologists, and the only one located east of the Missouri River. The district is made up of earth lodge sites, mortuary sites and artifact scatters from the Glenwood culture. They date from sometime between 1250 and 1400 C.E. The district was listed on the National Register of Historic Places in 2013.
