= Pickman House =

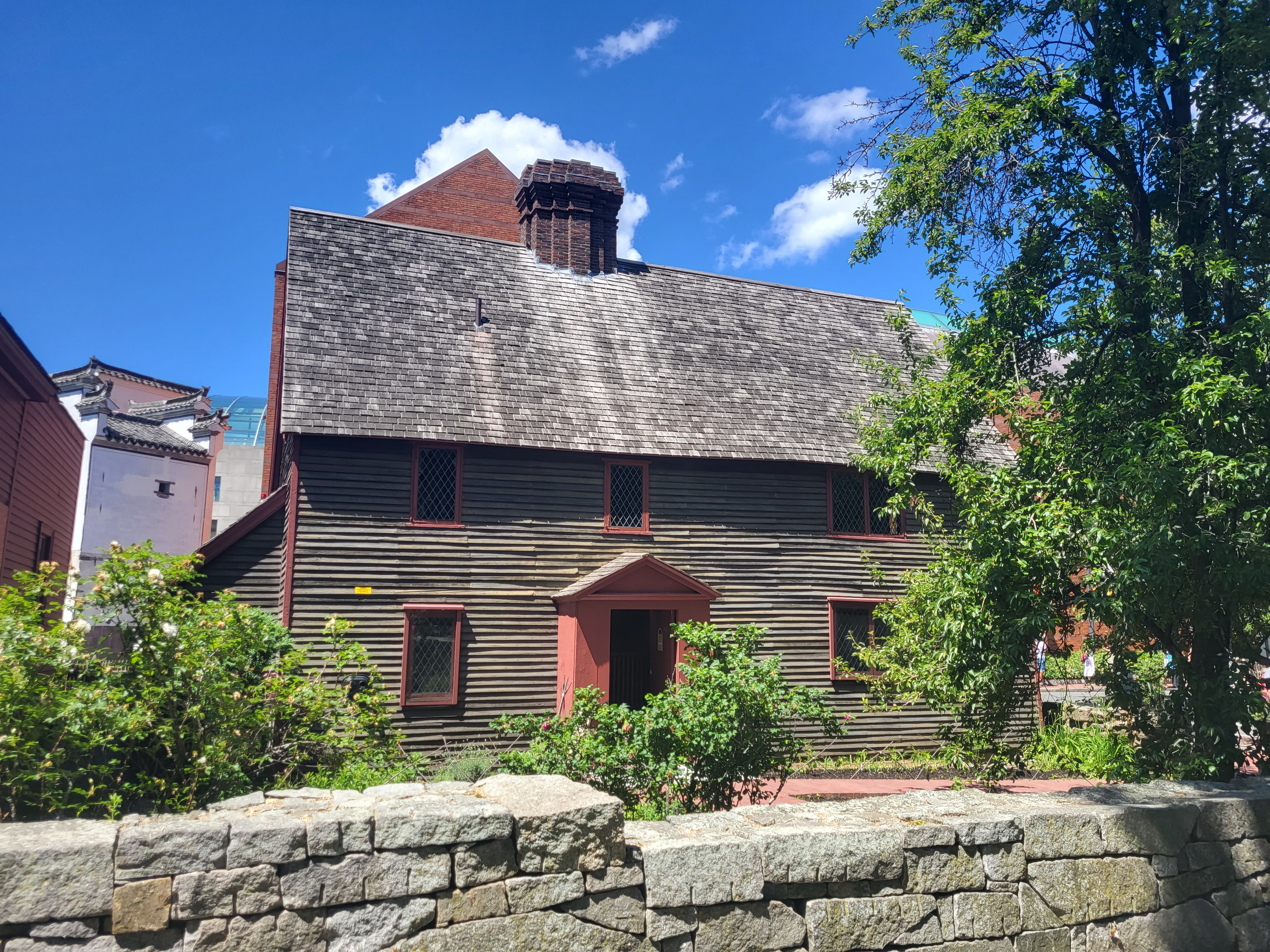
- The Pickman House in 2022

- Location within Massachusetts

General information
- Type: House
- Architectural style: First Period
- Location: Salem, Massachusetts, 43 Charter St
- Coordinates: 42°31′13″N 70°53′34″W
- Completed: c. 1665 (PEM) c. 1671 (Mallory) c. 1680 (MACRIS)
- Renovated: 1969 (restored)

Website
- web.archive.org/web/20210419002454/https://www.pem.org/visit/historic-houses/samuel-pickman-house

The Pickman House is a First Period structure located on Charter Street in Salem, Massachusetts, behind the Peabody Essex Museum. As no published dendrochronology study has been done, the exact build date of this home is disputed. In either case the house is thought to have stood during the Salem witch trials of 1692 and 1693. The house is now part of a group of properties that form the Charter Street Historic District. It has been described by the Massachusetts Historical Commission as a rare surviving example of 17th-century architecture. The house was restored by Historic Salem, Inc. in 1969 and purchased by the Peabody Essex Museum in 1983. It is listed in the National Register of Historic Places.

== History ==
Samuel Pickman was a mariner who acquired land to build his house in 1657. When he chose to build the house is now disputed among three different dates by sources. An early date of 1671, which was obtained through an unpublished dendrochronology study was taken by architectural conservator Steven Mallory. The Peabody Essex Museum which features Mallory's interview though states that the house dates to 1665. The third and latest proposed date is 1680, as assessed by the Massachusetts Historical Society in 1979. In any case, Pickman's estate inventory mentioned a house on his tract by May 9, 1687.

In addition to its age, the home is also notable for having residences over the subsequent years which include; Judge and Chief Justice of the Massachusetts Bay Colony Benjamin Lynde, Jr., and artist Michele Felice Corne. The Pickman House at one time had a Victorian era roof which concealed the 17th-century structure. These 17th-century features were not discovered until 1968 as part of a commission to study the house. Architectural historian Abbott Lowell Cummings stated that the "room at the left with leanto roof at right angles may have existed at the outset, and was later raised to a full two stories about 1725." During this time a new chimney was added, and the one-story porch with embellished posts dates to around c. 1800.

The Pickman House was eventually restored by Historic Salem in 1969 and was operated as a house museum in the 1970s. Exhibits included 17th century paraphernalia with historical animatronic mannequins in every room which were push button activated. The layout of the museum involved both floors which consisted of three bedrooms, a kitchen, and an attic that had been converted into the curator's quarters. While there was no mention of a bathroom or living room area, the museum included a red barn beside the house which operated as a gift shop. In 1983 the Peabody Essex Museum purchased the house and the museum was later closed to make way for corporate offices. The Pickman house presently abuts the Salem Witch Memorial, which was dedicated in 1992 on the 300th anniversary of the Salem witch trials. In 2021 the home was re-opened to the public again as a welcome center for the charter street cemetery.

== Alleged ghost girl ==
With a history spanning at least 300 years the Pickman House is rumored to be haunted by supernatural phenomena. Author Sam Baltrusis states in his book that several people on tours have allegedly seen a full-bodied apparition of a girl in the upper-floor window. This is also mentioned by Visionary Living, Inc in their book of an unknown girl looking out windows. According to "local folklore" the girl is from a family of three who lived in the house sometime during the 18th century. The father is said to have slowly gone insane from an evil entity and murdered both his seven-year-old daughter and wife before fleeing the house. Despite the story, Baltrusis admitted that he found no historical evidence to back up the claim. In a review of his book it was pointed out that Baltrusis has repeated myths that have since been corrected by historians and genealogists.

== Gallery ==
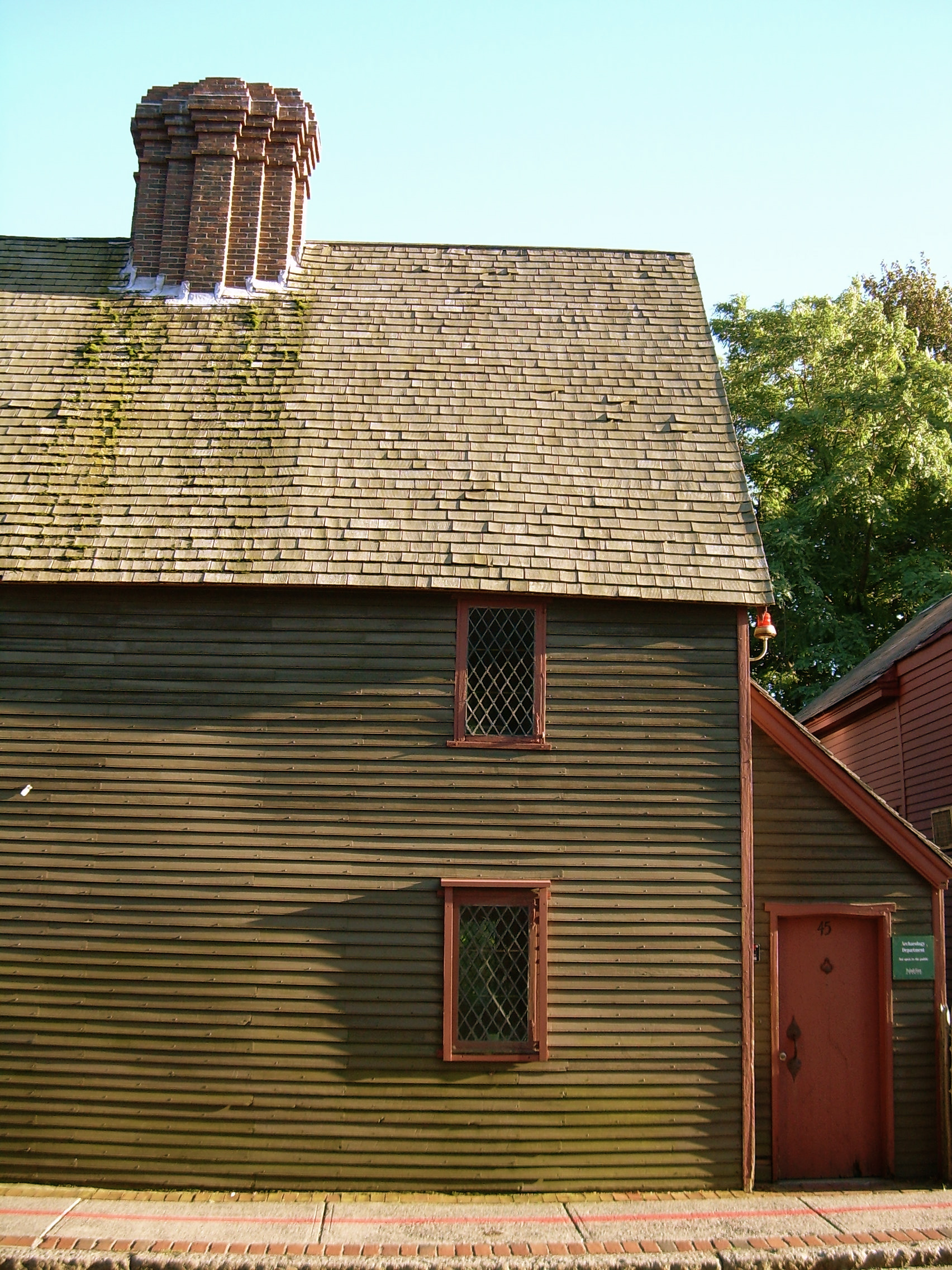
Back side of the Pickman House taken from Charter St.

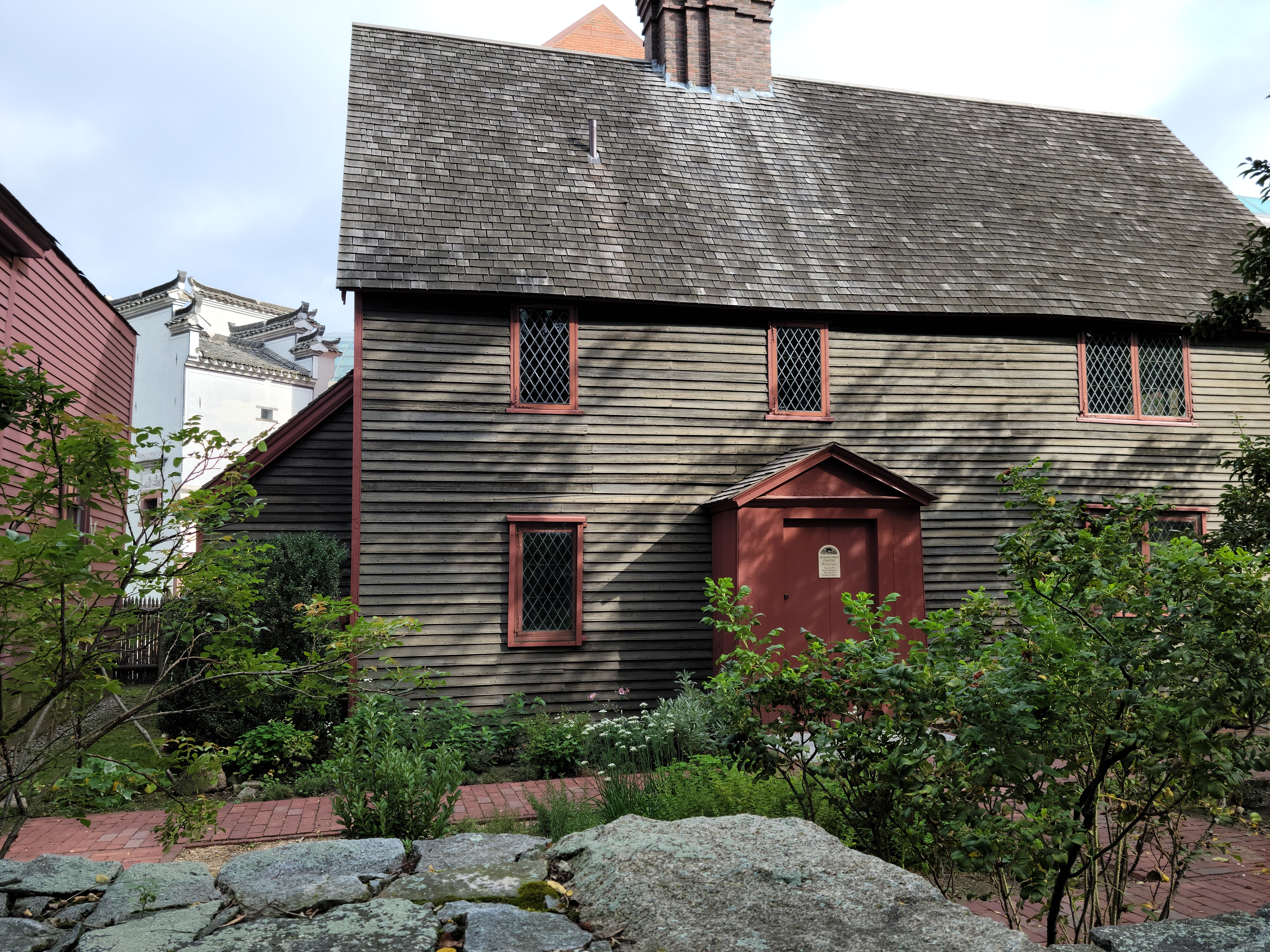
Pickman House in 2021.

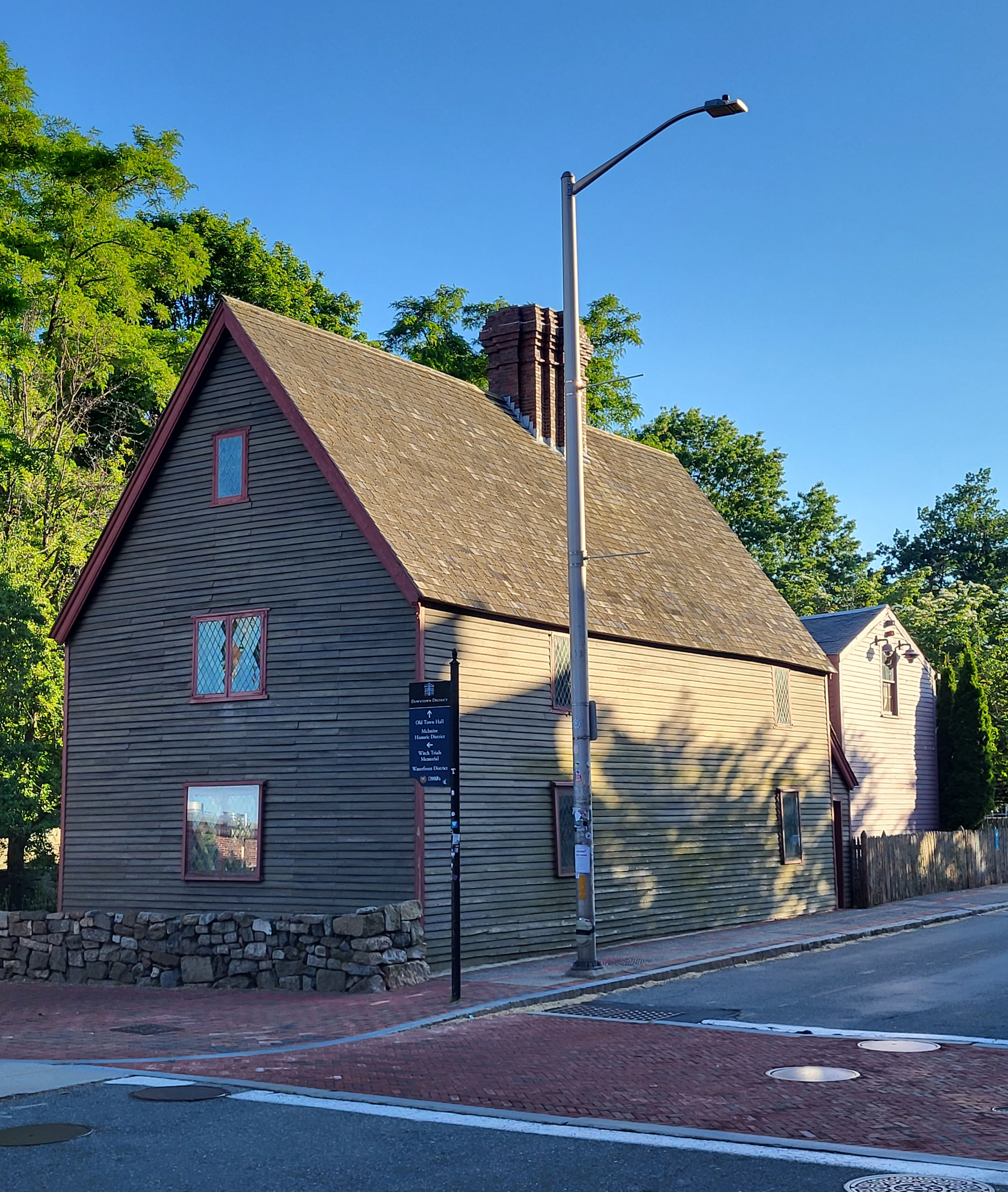
This is viewing the house from an angle.

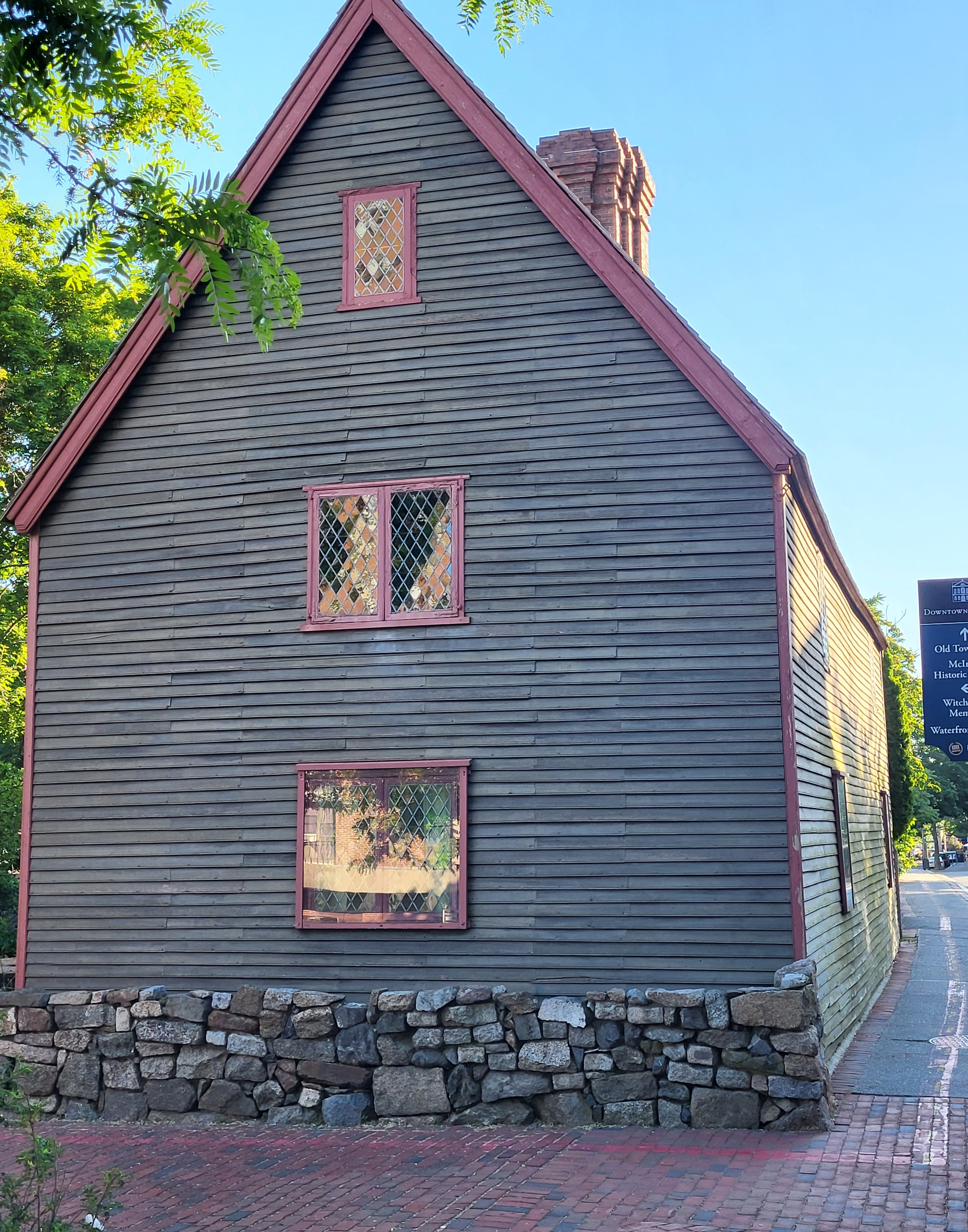
Side of the Pickman House. (the lowest pane is protected by an external frame)

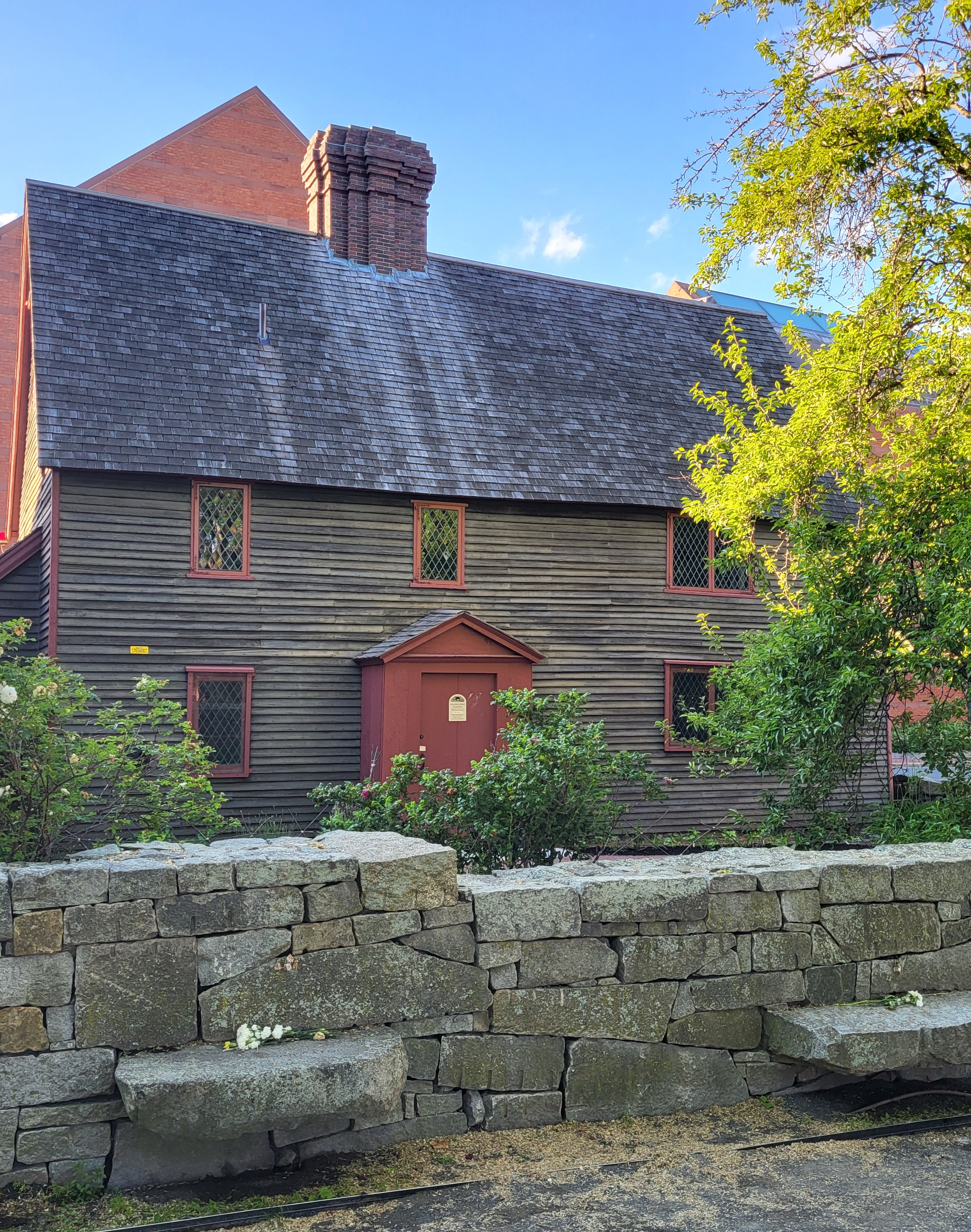
Front side of the Pickman House at Dusk.

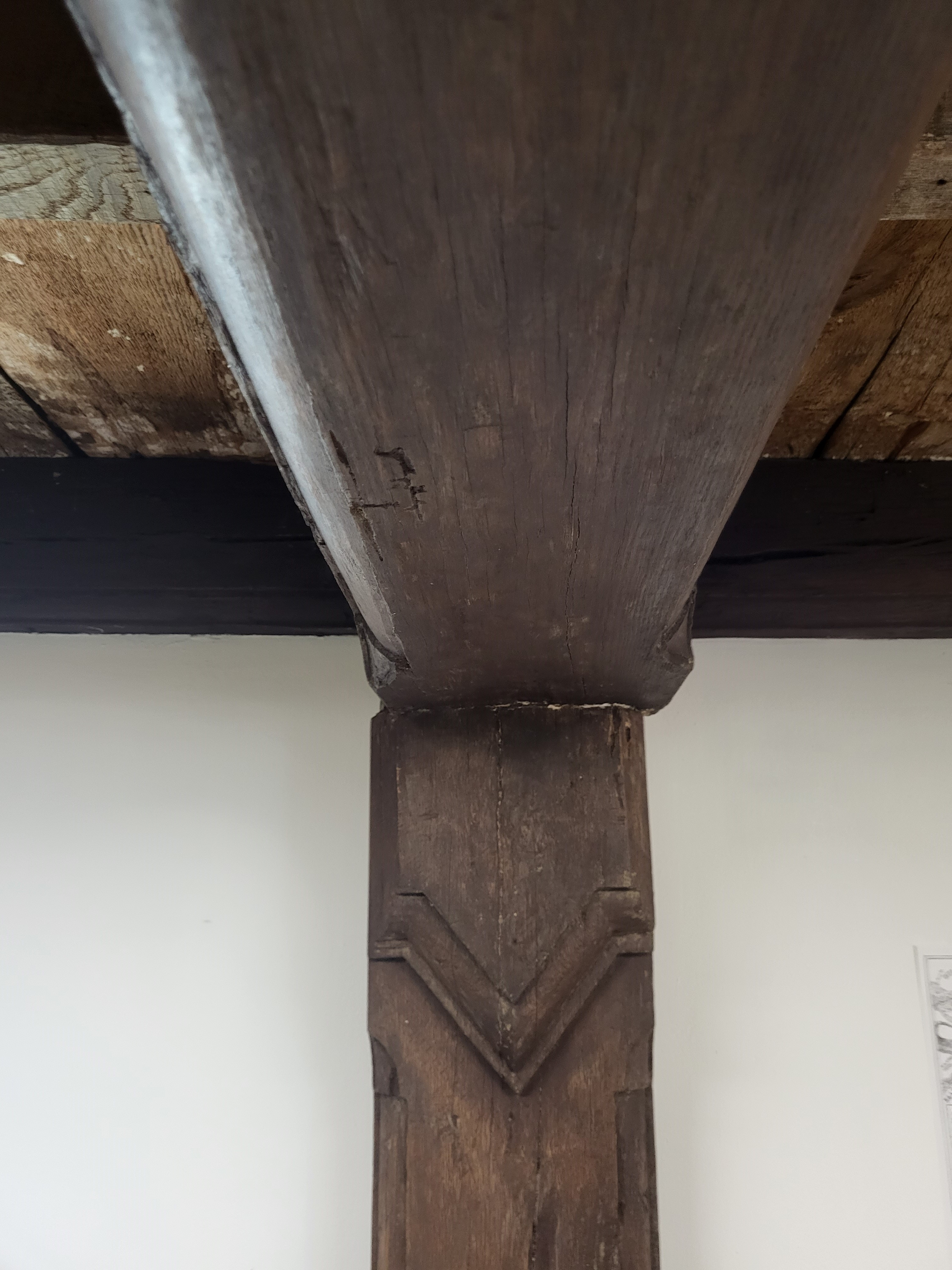
Ornately carved interior summer beam.

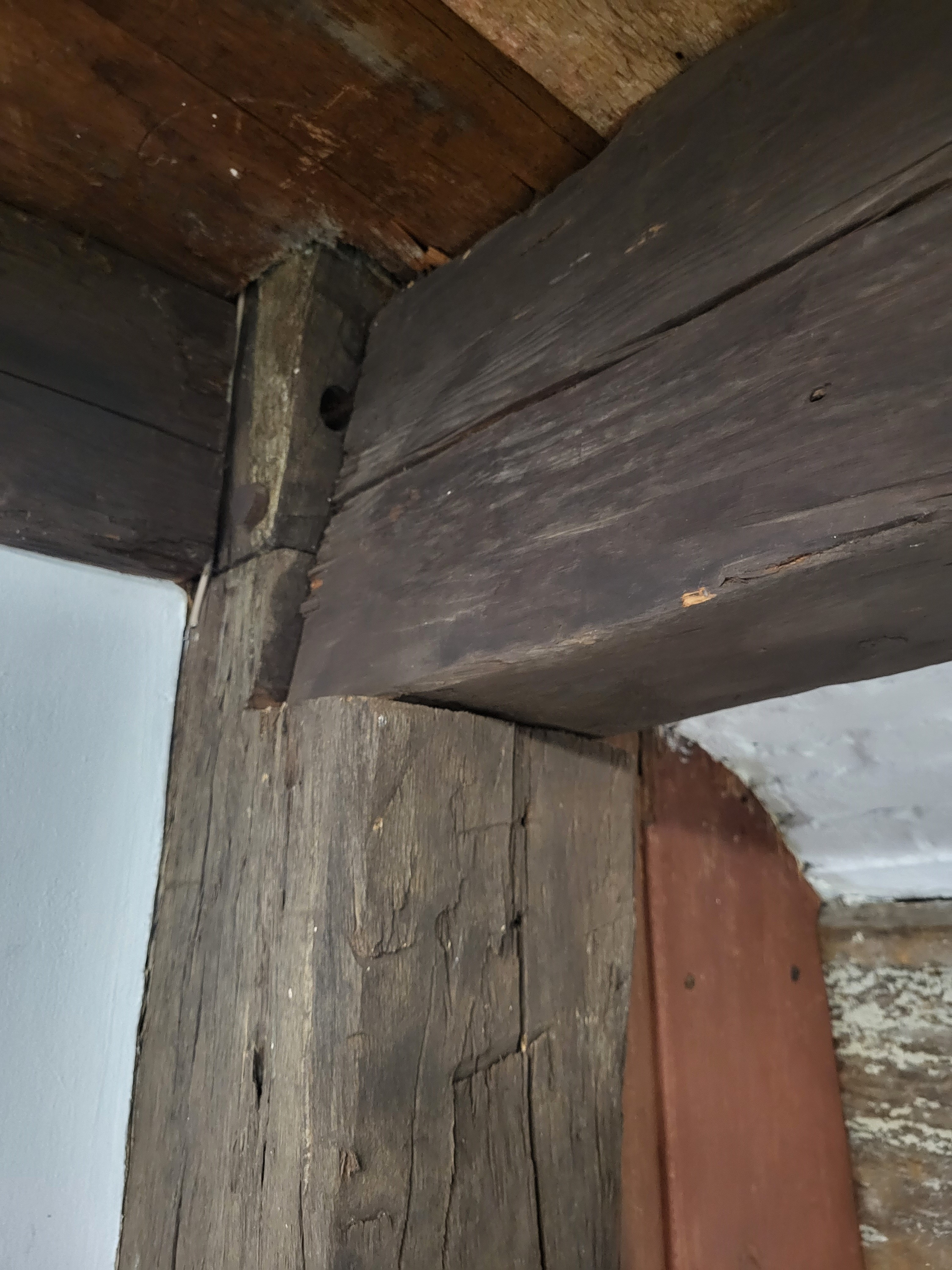
Another summer beam

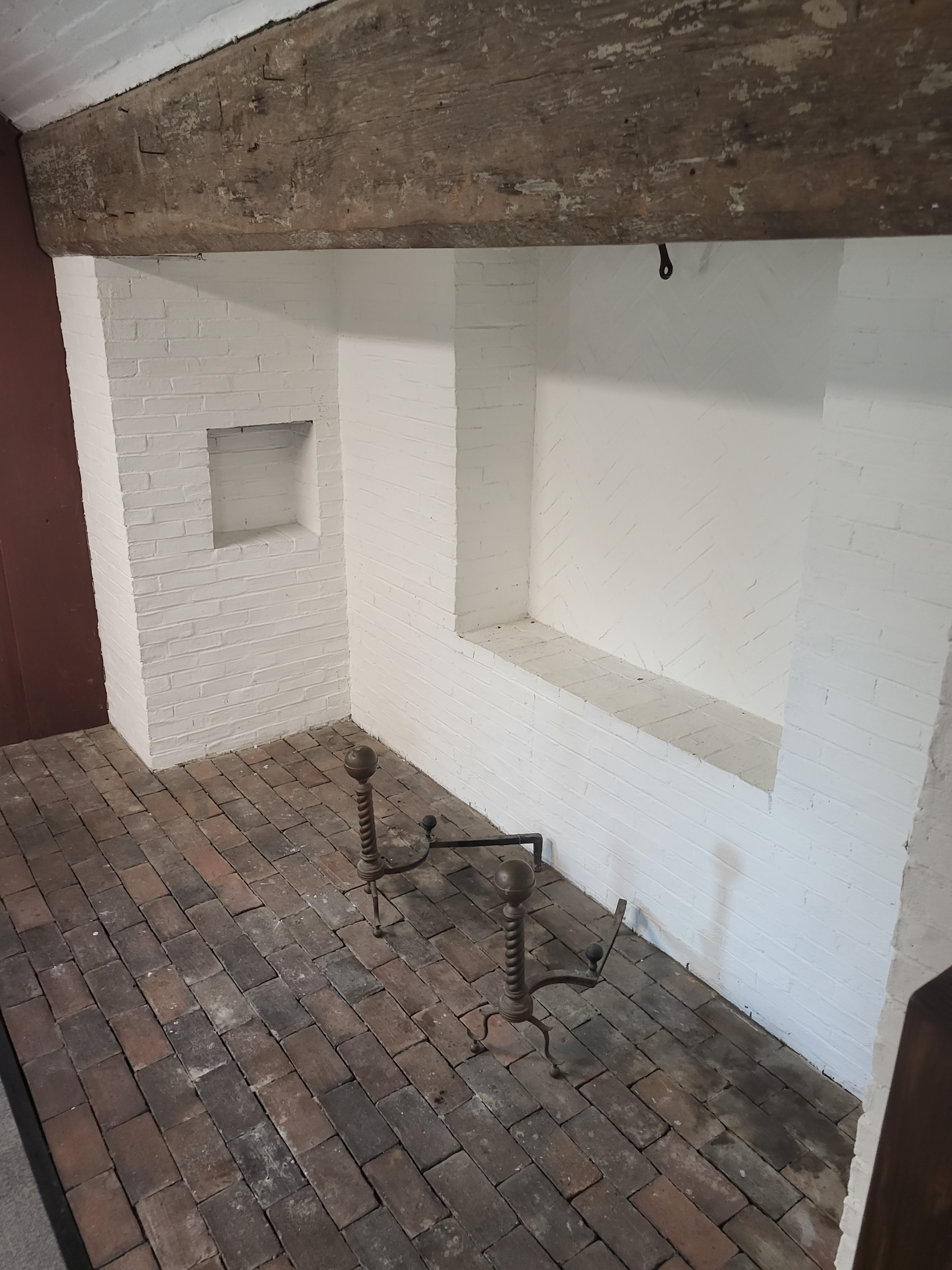
Original fireplace

== See also ==
- National Register of Historic Places listings in Salem, Massachusetts
- List of the oldest buildings in Massachusetts
- List of historic houses in Massachusetts
- List of the oldest buildings in the United States
