= Fuller–Bemis House =

Historic house in Massachusetts, United States

- U.S. National Register of Historic Places
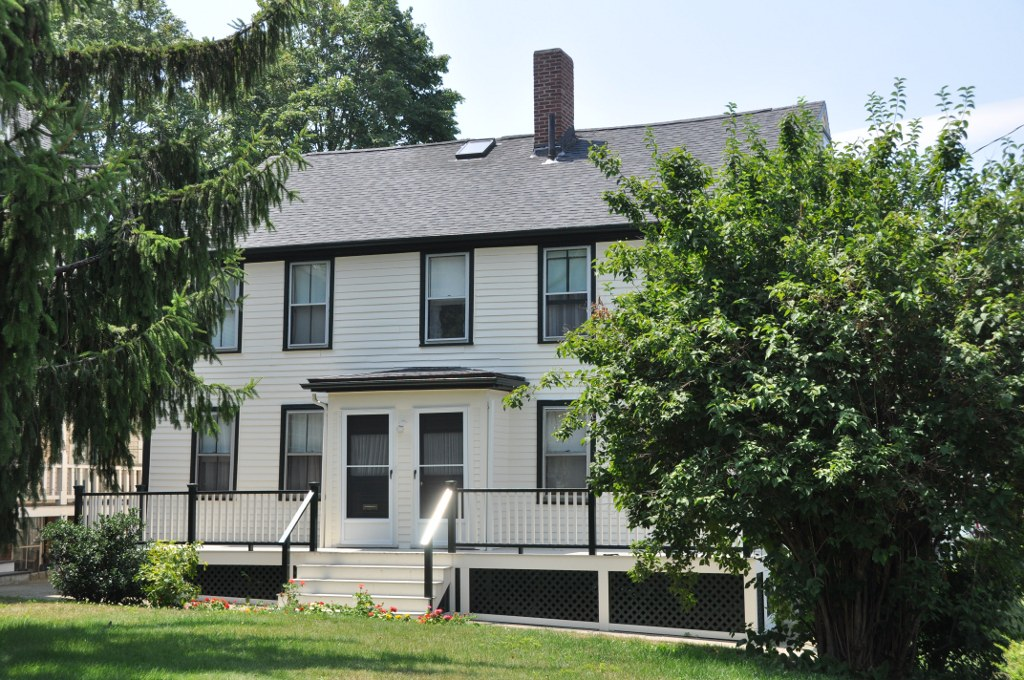

- Location within Massachusetts Location within the United States
- Location: 41–43 Cherry St., Waltham, Massachusetts
- Coordinates: 42°22′1.7″N 71°14′27.7″W
- Built: 1776
- Architectural style: Georgian
- MPS: Waltham MRA
- NRHP reference No.: 89001495
- Added to NRHP: March 09, 1990

The Fuller–Bemis House is a historic house at 41–43 Cherry Street in Waltham, Massachusetts, United States. The 2 1/2-story wood-frame house was built c. 1776, and is one of Waltham's few 18th century houses. It was built when the south side, where it is located, was still part of Newton. It was converted into a two-family structure in the 19th century. Its relatively plain Georgian styling sets it apart from the later 19th century housing that surrounds it.

The house was listed on the National Register of Historic Places in 1990.

== See also ==
- National Register of Historic Places listings in Waltham, Massachusetts
- List of the oldest buildings in Massachusetts
- List of the oldest buildings in the United States
