= Rev. Daniel Putnam House =

Historic house in Massachusetts, United States

- U.S. National Register of Historic Places
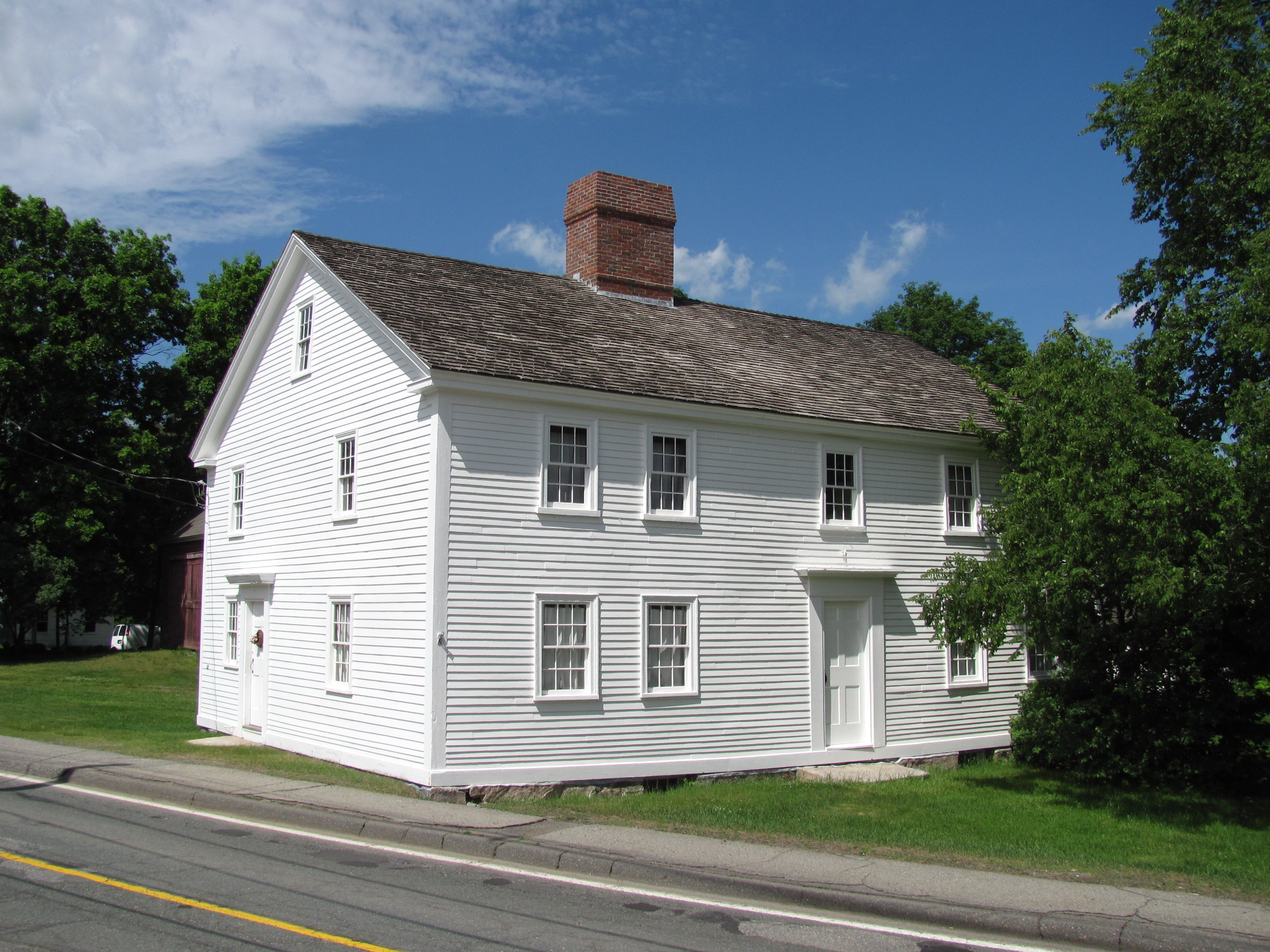
- Rev. Daniel Putnam House

- Location within Massachusetts Location within the United States
- Location: 27 Bow Street, North Reading, Massachusetts
- Coordinates: 42°34′27″N 71°4′40″W
- Built: 1720
- Architectural style: Colonial
- MPS: First Period Buildings of Eastern Massachusetts TR
- NRHP reference No.: 90000176
- Added to NRHP: March 9, 1990

Rev. Daniel Putnam House is a historic late First Period colonial house in North Reading, Massachusetts. Built in 1720, it is a 2 1/2-story wood-frame structure, five bays wide, with a side-gable roof, central chimney, and a Federal/Greek Revival entry surround. The house is distinctive in having an extremely well-preserved interior chamber, with intact plaster and paint. The house is owned by the town of North Reading. It is the headquarters of the North Reading Historical and Antiquarian Society. The house is open Society meetings and for special events. The house was added to the National Register of Historic Places in 1990.

== See also ==
- National Register of Historic Places listings in Middlesex County, Massachusetts
