= Charter Street Historic District =

Historic district in Massachusetts, United States

- U.S. National Register of Historic Places
- U.S. Historic district
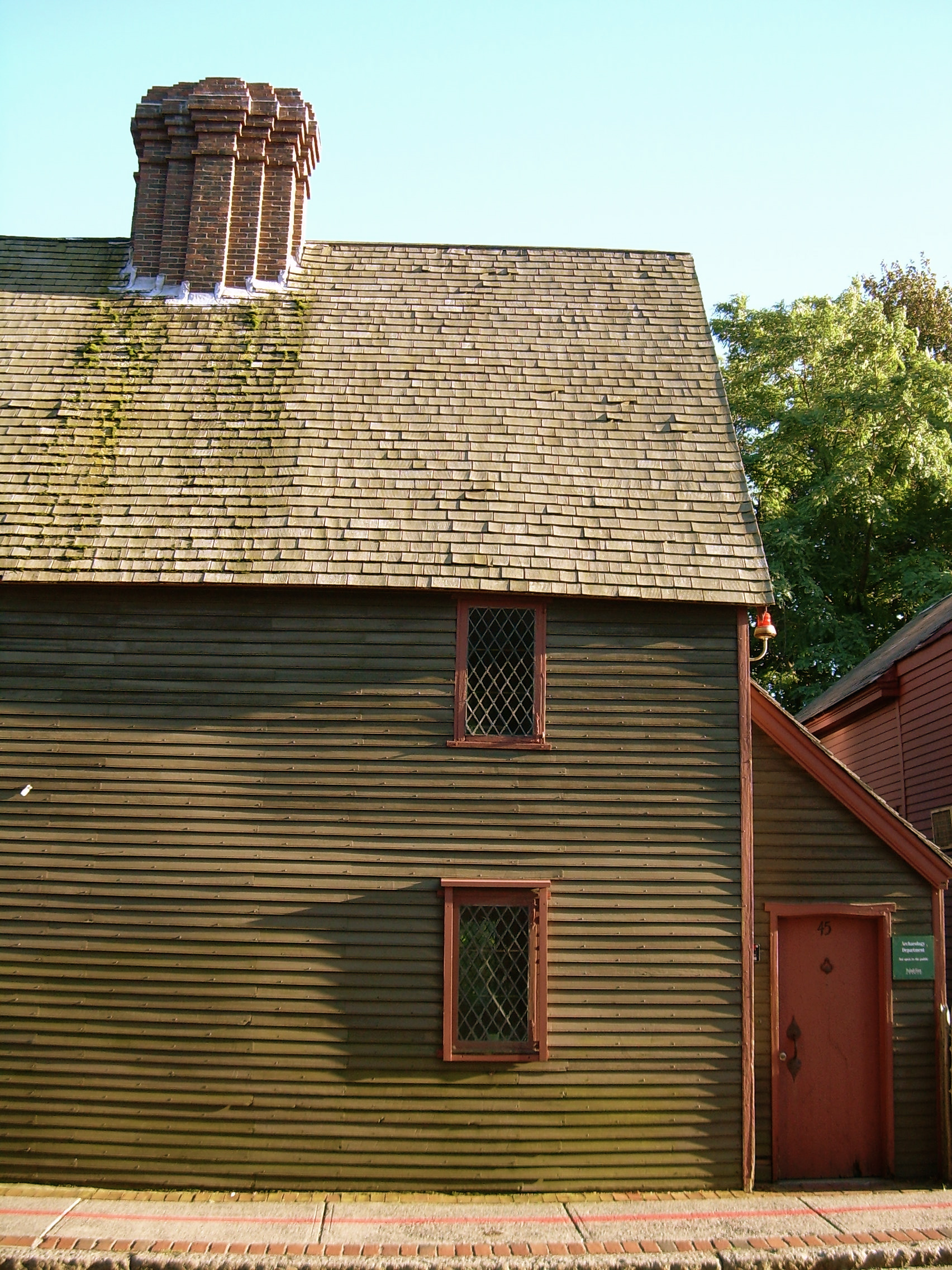
- The Pickman House, c. 1664, located on Charter Street and believed to be Salem's oldest surviving building

- Location within Massachusetts Location within the United States
- Location: Salem, Massachusetts
- Coordinates: 42°31′13″N 70°53′34″W
- Built: 1637
- Architectural style: Federal
- NRHP reference No.: 75000294
- Added to NRHP: March 10, 1975

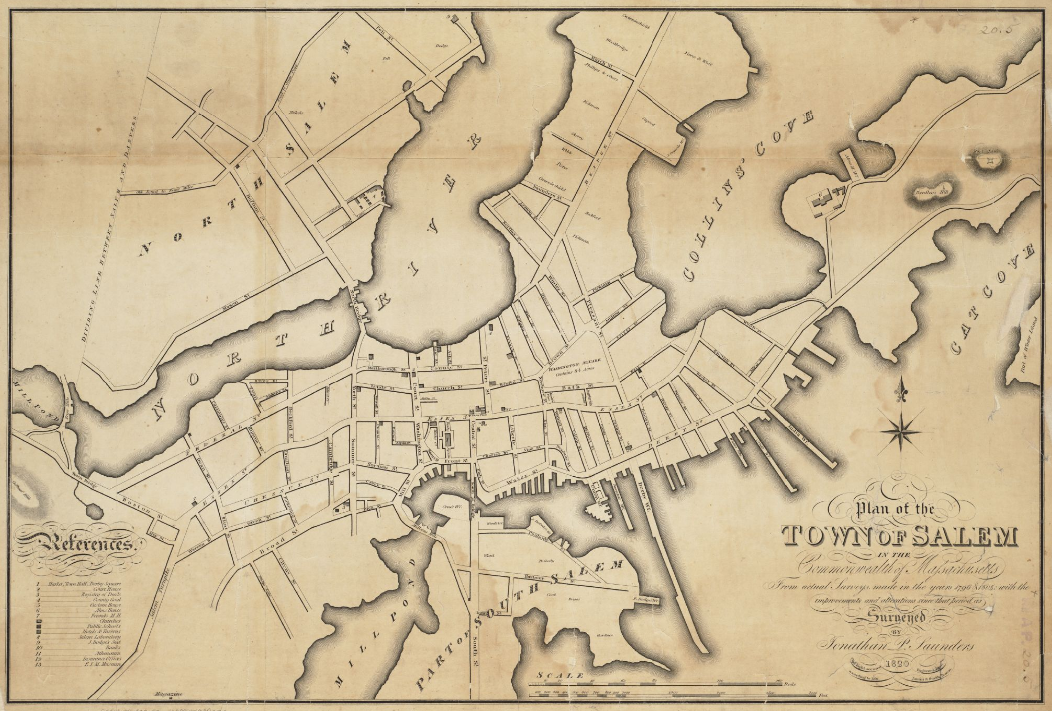
Salem - 1820

The Charter Street Historic District encompasses a small remnant of the oldest part of Salem, Massachusetts that has since been surrounded by more modern development. It includes three properties on Charter Street: the Pickman House, the Grimshawe House, and the Charter Street Cemetery, or Central Burying Point. The district was listed on the National Register of Historic Places in 1975.

== Pickman House ==
The Pickman House is located on Charter Street behind the Peabody Essex Museum, the oldest continually operated museum in America. The house, built in 1664 and is located on Charter Street. The house was restored by Historic Salem in 1969 and purchased by the museum in 1983. It stands just east of the cemetery entrance on the south side of Charter Street.

== Grimshawe House ==
The Grimshawe House is a Federal style three story wood-frame house that was built c. 1770, which stands just west of the cemetery entrance. It is most significant for its association with writer Nathaniel Hawthorne, who courted his future wife Sophia Peabody in the house, which was owned by her father. The house and the adjacent cemetery feature in a number of Hawthorne's works, most notably the unfinished Doctor Grimshawe's Secret: A romance.

== Charter Street Cemetery ==
The cemetery is a roughly rectangular plot of land that has been used as a burying ground since at least 1637. It includes several notable burials:

- Richard More, the only passenger of the Mayflower with a documented gravesite
- Simon Bradstreet, one of the founders and governor of the Massachusetts Bay Colony
- John Hathorne, ancestor of Nathaniel Hawthorne and a magistrate involved in the Salem witch trials

== See also ==
- List of historic houses in Massachusetts
- National Register of Historic Places listings in Salem, Massachusetts
- National Register of Historic Places listings in Essex County, Massachusetts
