= House at 215 Brookline Street =

Historic house in Massachusetts, United States

- U.S. National Register of Historic Places
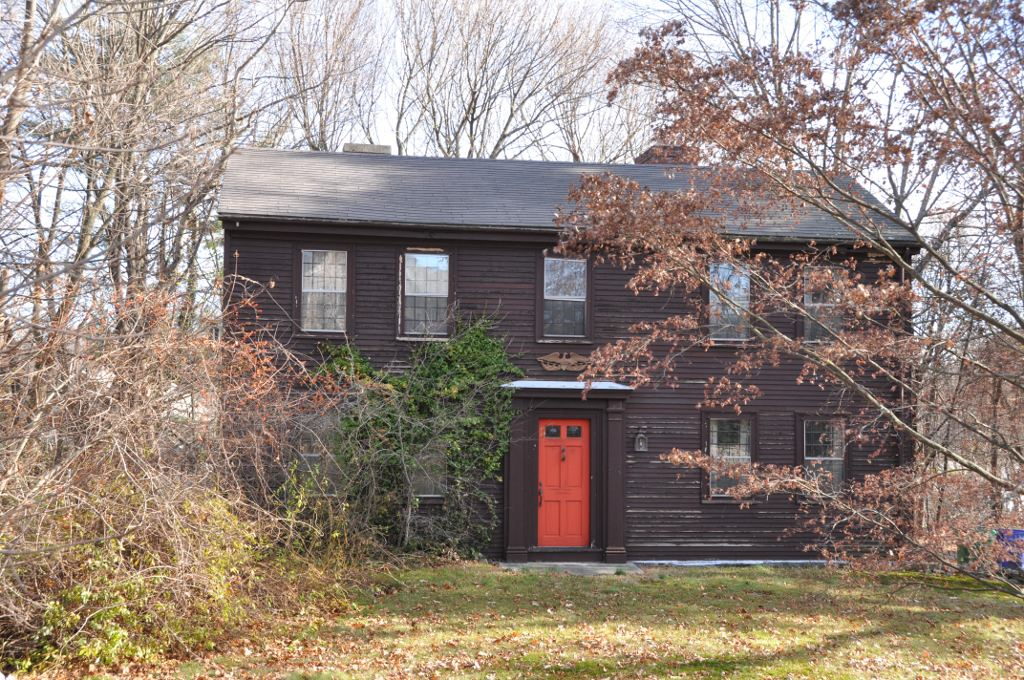

- Location within Massachusetts Location within the United States
- Location: 215 Brookline St., Newton, Massachusetts
- Coordinates: 42°18′6″N 71°10′42″W
- Built: 1693 (traditional) c.1719 (MACRIS)
- Architectural style: Georgian, Vernacular Georgian
- MPS: Newton MRA
- NRHP reference No.: 86001822
- Added to NRHP: September 04, 1986

The House at 215 Brookline Street is one of the oldest houses in Newton, Massachusetts. The oldest portion of the saltbox house was built ca. 1693 by Thomas Hastings, who was prominent in the civic affairs of the area. The house uncharacteristically faces north (typical period houses faced south) and exhibits simple but high-quality Georgian styling. It is 2½ stories in height, five bays in width, and has narrow clapboard siding. The main entrance is flanked by pilasters and topped by a shallow hood.

The house was listed on the National Register of Historic Places in 1986.

== See also ==
- List of the oldest buildings in Massachusetts
- National Register of Historic Places listings in Newton, Massachusetts
