= Acadian House (Guilford, Connecticut) =

Historic house in Connecticut, United States

- U.S. National Register of Historic Places
- U.S. Historic district – Contributing property
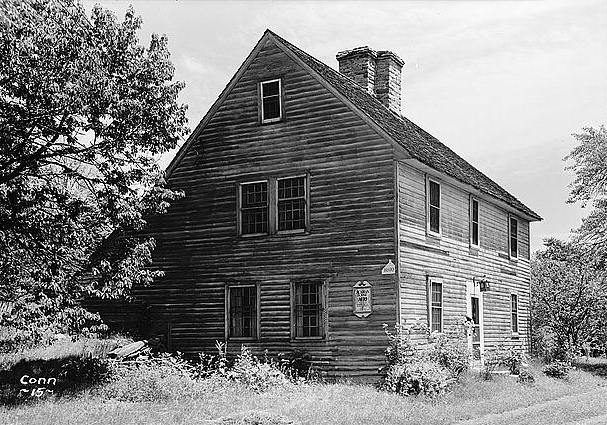

- Location within Connecticut Location within the United States
- Location: Union Street, Guilford, Connecticut
- Coordinates: 41°17′7″N 72°40′47″W
- Area: less than one acre
- Built: ca. 1670
- Built by: Clay, Joseph
- Architectural style: Saltbox
- Part of: Guilford Historic Town Center (ID76001988)
- NRHP reference No.: 75001928

Significant dates
- Added to NRHP: September 05, 1975
- Designated CP: July 6, 1976

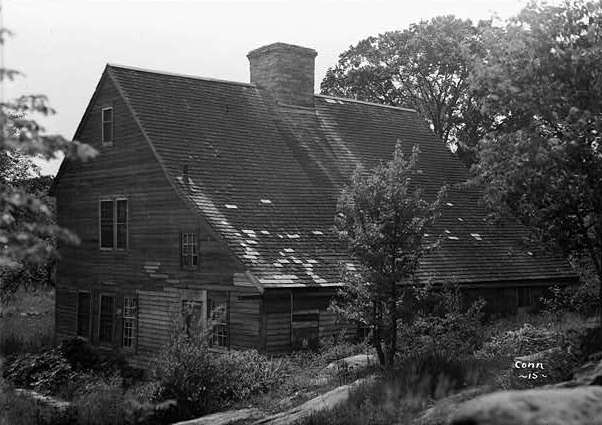

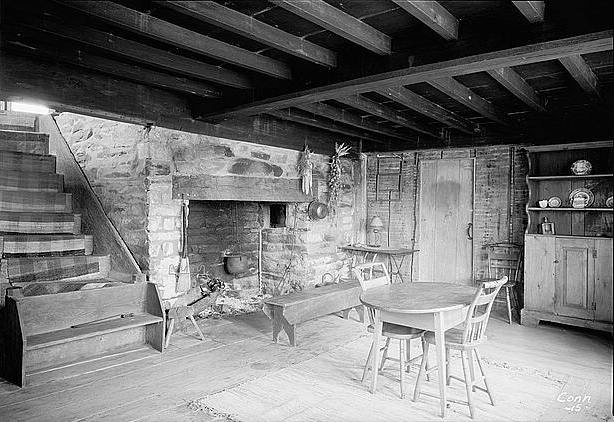

The Acadian House is a historic house on Union Street in Guilford, Connecticut. Built about 1670, it is one of Connecticut's oldest surviving houses, notable for its occupation by refugee Acadians following their 1755 deportation from Nova Scotia. The house was listed on the National Register of Historic Places in 1975.

== Description and history ==
The Acadian House is located in a residential setting just northeast of the town center of Guilford, on the south side of Union Street near its junction with Market Place. It is a 2 1/2-story timber-framed structure, with a gabled roof, large central chimney, and clapboarded exterior. Its main facade is oriented at an angle to the street. It is three bays wide with a central entrance framed with simple moulding and topped by a four-light transom window. The windows on either side of the entrance are placed asymmetrically. The rear slope of the roof extends to the first floor, giving the house a saltbox shape. The chimney has an unusual T shape, the result of a later expansion.

The oldest portion of the house was built around 1670 by Joseph Clay. The house has its name because a family of Acadians from Grand Pré settled in it following their 1755 deportation from Nova Scotia.

== See also ==
- List of the oldest buildings in Connecticut
- History of the Acadians
- National Register of Historic Places listings in New Haven County, Connecticut
