= John Woodward House =

Historic house in Massachusetts, United States

- U.S. National Register of Historic Places
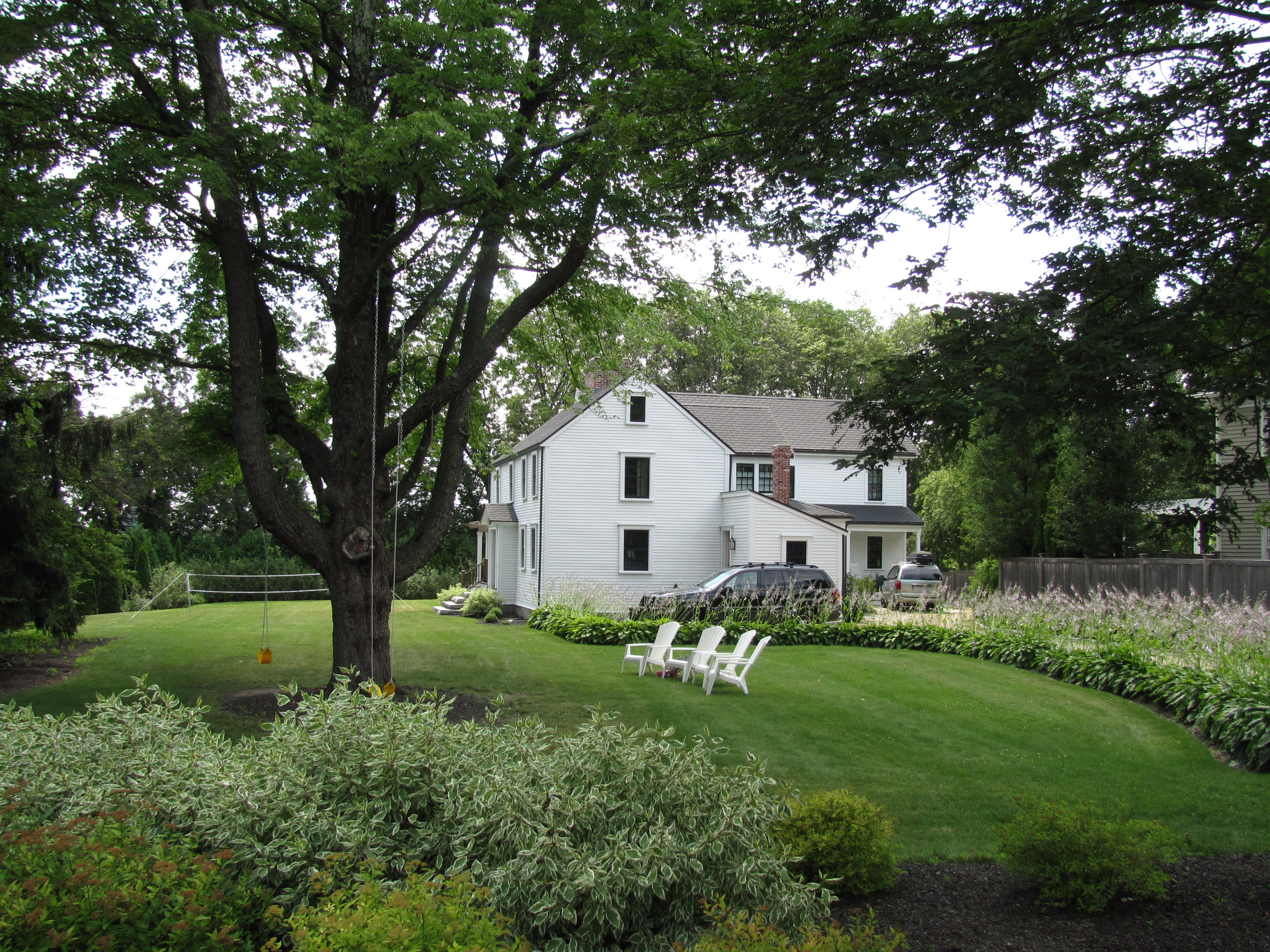
- John Woodward House

- Location within Massachusetts Location within the United States
- Location: 50 Fairlee Rd., Newton, Massachusetts
- Coordinates: 42°19′21.5″N 71°13′24.0″W
- Built: 1686
- Architect: Woodward, John
- Architectural style: Colonial
- MPS: Newton MRA
- NRHP reference No.: 86001897
- Added to NRHP: September 04, 1986

The John Woodward House is a historic house at 50 Fairlee Road in Newton, Massachusetts. Built sometime before 1686, it is one of the city's oldest surviving buildings. It is a 2 1/2-story timber-frame structure, with a large central chimney, and is four bays wide and one deep. Its front entry has sidelight windows that were probably added in the 19th century, and the entry is enclosed in a Colonial Revival portico. The house was for 275 years owned by the family of John Woodward, one of Newton's early settlers.

The house was listed on the National Register of Historic Places in 1986.

== See also ==
- National Register of Historic Places listings in Newton, Massachusetts
