= West Oak Forest Earthlodge Site =

- U.S. National Register of Historic Places
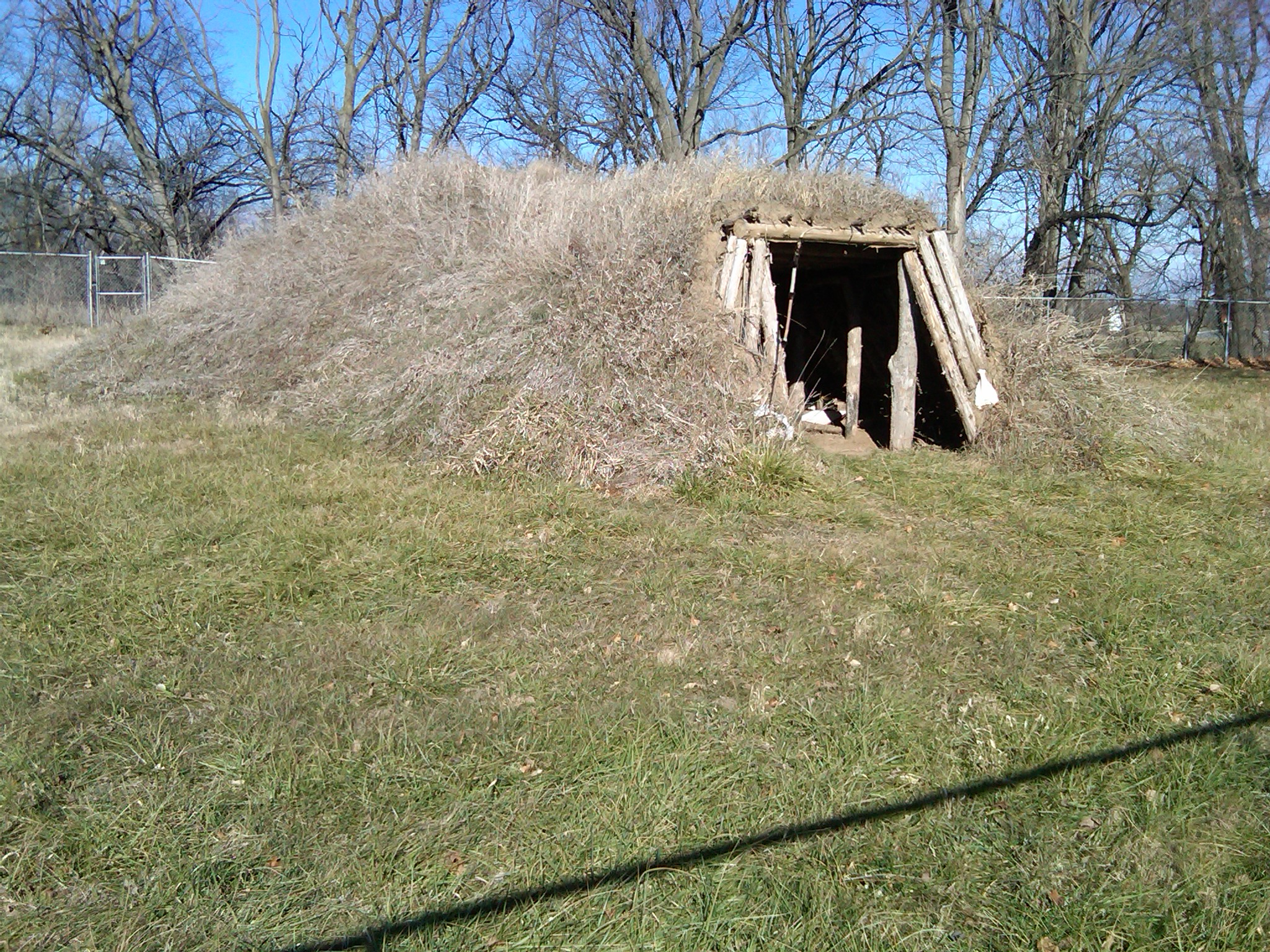
- Nearest city: Glenwood, Iowa
- MPS: Archeological Resources of the Central Plains Tradition in the Loess Hills Region of Iowa MPS
- NRHP reference No.: 10000342
- Added to NRHP: June 11, 2010

The West Oak Forest Earthlodge Site is a historic site located near Glenwood, Iowa, United States. It was discovered in 2009 by local archeologist Dennis Miller who found a depression of about 20 feet (6.1 m) in diameter, and a maximum depth of 24 inches (61 cm) below the surrounding area. It was authenticated by the Office of the State Archeologist the following year. This is one of 29 known earthlodges that exist from the Nebraska Phase of the Central Plains tradition (CPT) dating to the Plains Village Period. The earthlodges were dwellings that were composed of four central support posts, surrounded by shorter outer wall posts, with wattle and daub walls and roof. The depression in the earth was caused by the natural decay and caving-in of the earthlodge itself. In addition to the depression there have been 231 artifacts found at the site that dates from sometime between 1250 and 1400 C.E. The site was listed on the National Register of Historic Places in 2010.
