= List of museums in Puerto Rico =

This list of museums in Puerto Rico contains museums which are defined for this context as institutions (including nonprofit organizations, government entities, and private businesses) that collect and care for objects of cultural, artistic, scientific, or historical interest and make their collections or related exhibits available for public viewing. Museums that exist only in cyberspace (i.e., virtual museums) are not included.

| Name | Image | Municipality | Type | Summary |
|---|---|---|---|---|
| Alberto Ávila López Museum of the History of Camuy | | Camuy | Local history | Small local history museum and municipal archives. |
| Alfredo Ramírez de Arellano y Rosell Museum and House of Studies | | San Germán | Art | Municipal museum that showcases the art history of San Germán and southwestern Puerto Rico. |
| Arecibo Lighthouse Museum and Historical Park | | Arecibo | Local history | Historic lighthouse museum showcasing the last lighthouse to be built by the Spanish government in Puerto Rico. Also contains a history-themed park with interactive exhibitions and activities for children. |
| Arecibo Observatory Angel Ramos Foundation Visitor Center | | Arecibo | Science | Astronomy and atmospheric sciences museum that serves as the visitor center to the Arecibo Observatory while showcasing the workings of radio telescopes. |
| Ashford House Museum | | San Juan | Biographical | Former residence of Bailey Ashford, now a museum dedicated to the life and work of the founder of the School of Tropical Medicine of Puerto Rico. |
| Aurelio Tió Nazario de Figueroa House Museum | | San Germán | Historic house | Former residence of multiple figures in Puerto Rico's history such as poet Lola Rodríguez de Tió and members of the Ponce de León family. |
| Bayamón Museum of Art | | Bayamón | Art | Contemporary and abstract art primarily dedicated to Puerto Rican artists of the 21st century. |
| Caguana Ceremonial Ball Courts Site Museum | | Utuado | Archaeology | Located in the Caguana Indigenous Ceremonial Center it houses one of the largest archaeological collections in Puerto Rico donated by the University of Puerto Rico and the Ana G. Méndez University. Operated by the Institute of Puerto Rican Culture. |
| Caguas Museum of Art | | Caguas | Art | Contemporary art museum located in a historic neoclassical residence popularly known as Casa Amarilla and dedicated to the work of Carlos Osorio with additional rotating art exhibitions and cultural events. |
| Caguas Museum of Folk Arts | | Caguas | Art | Folk art museum that showcases the work of master Criollo craftsmen and artists such as Zoilo Cajigas, Celestino Avilés, and Domingo Orta. |
| Caguas Museum of History | | Caguas | Local history | Local history museum located in the former city hall of Caguas. Also known as the Museum of Caguas. |
| Casa Armstrong-Poventud Museum | | Ponce | Local history | Historic house museum located in a Ponce Creole-style historic residence showcasing life in 19th-century Ponce. Operated by the Institute of Puerto Rican Culture and the municipality of Ponce. |
| Casa Alegría Museum | | Dorado | Art | Former residence of artist Marco Juan Alegría featuring visual arts and memorabilia. |
| Casa Alonso Museum of Art, History and Culture | | Vega Baja | Multiple | Historic neoclassical vernacular house museum with additional exhibits on local history, culture and folk arts. |
| Casa Cautiño Museum | | Guayama | Historic house | Historic residence featuring handmade furniture, designs and sculptures by local artists. Operated by the Institute of Puerto Rican Culture. |
| Casa de la Familia Puertorriqueña del Siglo XIX | | San Juan | Historic house | Traditional Old San Juan residence showcasing local life during the 19th century. Operated by the Institute of Puerto Rican Culture. |
| Casa de los Contrafuertes - Museum of Our African Roots | | San Juan | Local history | Originally a historical pharmacy museum located in a historic residence known as Casa de los Contrafuentes, now an art museum that focuses on Afro-Puerto Rican heritage and visual arts. Operated by the Institute of Puerto Rican Culture. |
| Casa del Libro | | San Juan | Literature | Museum dedicated to the history of literature and book printing in Puerto Rico and the world with unique collections such as a Gutenberg Bible specimen. |
| Casa del Rey Museum | | Dorado | Local history | Local history museum located in a former Spanish government building and regional military headquarters. Converted into a residential building during the late 19th-century and at some point, residence of Manuel Alonso y Pacheco, Puerto Rico's notable romantic writer. |
| Casa del Trovador | | Caguas | Music | Former house of musician Luis Miranda, now a museum dedicated to the music history of Caguas and the trobador musical heritage of Puerto Rico. |
| Casa Dra. Concha Melendez Ramirez Museum | | San Juan | Biographical | Former residence, now library and museum on writer and educator Concha Meléndez, the first woman to belong to the Puerto Rican Academy of Languages. |
| Casa Escuté Museum | | Carolina | Art | Local art museum located in a historic building on the Plaza Rey Fernando III. |
| Casa Grande Museum | | Mayagüez | Historic house | Former 1820 Neoclassical residence considered one of the most important architectural assets of Mayagüez. |
| Casa Jesús T. Piñero Museum | | Canóvanas | Biographical | Operated by the Institute of Puerto Rican Culture, 1930s period home of governor Jesús T. Piñero. |
| Casa Luis Muñoz Rivera Museum | | Barranquitas | Biographical | Operated by the Institute of Puerto Rican Culture, home of politician Luis Muñoz Rivera. |
| Casa Paoli Museum | | Ponce | Biographical | Former residence of Puerto Rican tenor Antonio Paoli now a museum dedicated to his life and music. |
| Casa Portela Museum | | Vega Baja | Local history | Operated by the municipality of Vega Baja, dedicated to the local culture and history of the municipality. |
| Casa Pueblo Museum | | Adjuntas | Multiple | Local culture, art, crafts, nature and the environment at the headquarters of the non-profit environmental community organization of the same name. The property includes the neighboring historic Washington Irving Graded School. |
| Casa Roig Museum | | Humacao | Historic house | Historic house museum and former residence of sugarcane magnate Antonio Roig, designed by Antonin Nechodoma in the Prairie School style. Operated by the University of Puerto Rico. |
| Castillo San Felipe del Morro | | San Juan | Military | Large 18th-century fortress originally commissioned by King Charles I of Spain in 1539 to defend the entrance to the San Juan Bay. Part of San Juan National Historic Site and operated by the National Park Service. |
| Castillo Serrallés Museum (Sugar Cane and Rum Museum) | | Ponce | Agriculture | Museum with exhibits on the island's sugar cane and rum industries with local art exhibitions located in Castillo Serrallés, a historic Spanish Colonial Revival mansion and former residence of the Serrallés family, founders of the Destilería Serrallés rum producer famous for Don Q. |
| Centro Cultural de Barceloneta Museum | | Barceloneta | Local history | Small local history museum located at the Barceloneta cultural center. |
| Centro Musical Criollo José Ignacio Quintón | | Caguas | Music | Music museum, library and arts community center located in the former First Baptist Church of Caguas. |
| Ciales Coffee Museum | | Ciales | Industry | Showcases the history of coffee cultivation and production in the Ciales area, also hosts a café where it is possible to try locally produced coffees. |
| Coamo Historic Museum | | Coamo | Local history | Museum located in the former residence of a sugarcane and tobacco industrialist that showcases the history and industry of Coamo and its surroundings. |
| Culebra Historical Museum | | Culebra | Local history | Former powder and warehouse, now a museum that showcases the history of Culebra from its indigenous times throughout its Spanish and French settlement up to modern times. |
| Doña Bisa House Museum | | San Sebastián | Historic house | Historic house museum and former residence of celebrated local figure Doña Bisa. |
| Dr. Josefina Camacho de la Nuez Museum and Center for Humanistic Studies | | Gurabo | Art | Small art museum and gallery located in a community cultural center. |
| Dr. Modesto Iriarte BONUS Technological Museum | | Rincón | Science | Decommissioned superheater nuclear power plant now a museum on nuclear energy production and use. |
| Dr. Pio Lopez Martinez Art Museum | | Cayey | Art | Operated by the University of Puerto Rico at Cayey, it features the work of Ramon Frade and a poster collection that showcases Puerto Rican popular culture and visual arts. |
| EcoExploratorio | | San Juan | Science | Small museum dedicated to science and technology located in Plaza de Las Américas. |
| El Cemí Museum | | Jayuya | Art | Museum dedicated to the religious art of the Taino people, particularly the indigenous art of zemi carving. |
| El Cortijo | | Barranquitas | Historic house | Historic Rafael Carmoega-designed country house Mission/Spanish Revival-style with landscaped gardens inspired by Barcelona's Parc Güell. Open to the public by appointment only. |
| El Jefe Museum | | San Juan | Music | Music museum dedicated to reggaeton and the music of Daddy Yanky, located in Plaza de Las Américas. |
| El Portal Rainforest Center | | Río Grande | Natural history | Visitor center and natural history museum that showcases the flora and fauna of El Yunque National Forest. Operated by the United States Forest Service and the Conservation Trust of Puerto Rico. |
| Farmacia Domínguez Museum | | San Germán | Medicine | Pharmacy museum located in a historic apothecary. |
| Federico Degetau House and Museum | | Aibonito | Biographical | Former home of politician and author Federico Degetau. |
| Felisa Rincón de Gautier House Museum | | San Juan | Biographical | Life of Felisa Rincón de Gautier, women's rights activist and first female mayor of San Juan. Popularly known as Museo de Doña Fela. |
| Fort San Cristóbal | | San Juan | Military | Historic 17th-century fortress and the largest European fortification built in the Americas established to protect San Juan from foreign and pirate attacks from the Atlantic Ocean and the San Juan Bay. Part of San Juan National Historic Site and operated by the National Park Service. |
| Fortín de San Gerónimo Museum | | San Juan | Military | Historic 18th-century fort and key feature of the advance defense line that protected San Juan from westward attacks. Now hosts a small museum dedicated to the military history of the Spanish Empire in Puerto Rico being developed by the Institute of Puerto Rican Culture and the National Park Service. |
| Francisco Oller Museum | | Bayamón | Multiple | Local history, art and culture museum with particular emphasis on Puerto Rican Impressionist painter Francisco Oller, located in the former city hall of Bayamón |
| Francisco "Pancho" Coimbre Museum | | Ponce | Sports | Museum dedicated to the history of sports in Puerto Rico, particularly of baseball and the life of some of the most famous Puerto Rican baseball players. |
| Fuerte de Vieques Museum | | Vieques | Multiple | Local history, art and indigenous culture museum located in a historic 19th-century Spanish fortress built to defend Isabel Segunda from pirate and foreign attacks; also known as Museum Fort Count Mirasol. Operated by the Institute of Puerto Rican Culture. |
| Guaynabo Telegraph Museum | | Guaynabo | Science | Small science museum located in the former telephone and telegraph station of Guaynabo about the history of the telegraph in Puerto Rico. |
| Hacienda Buena Vista Museum | | Ponce | Agriculture | Historic coffee plantation, farm and manor house. Operated by the Conservation Trust of Puerto Rico. |
| Hacienda Enriqueta Museum | | Moca | Historic house | Museum that showcases a well-preserved former German-Puerto Rican hacienda. |
| Hacienda La Esperanza Museum | | Manatí | Agriculture | Historic sugarcane plantation and manor house that showcases the development of the sugarcane industry in Puerto Rico. |
| Hacienda La Fe Museum | | San Sebastián | Agriculture | Former plantation and farm, now a municipal museum of agriculture and the local agricultural history. |
| Hacienda Lealtad Museum | | Lares | Agriculture | Historic coffee plantation and farm. |
| Héctor Flores Osuna House Museum | | Caguas | Music | Museum and former house of composer Héctor Flores Osuna, with additional exhibits on Puerto Rican music and dance. |
| Herminio Torres Grillo Tobacco Museum | | Caguas | Industry | Small museum located in an old tobacco processing center dedicated to the industry of tobacco, snuff and the art of hand rolling of cigars. Also known as the Caguas Tobacco Museum. |
| Historic House of Music in Cayey | | Cayey | Music | Music museum and community arts center located in a historic house. |
| House and Museum of the Three Kings of Juana Díaz | | Juana Díaz | Folk | Museum and exhibition hall dedicated to the local Biblical Magi tradition, popularly known as the Santos Reyes de Juana Díaz. |
| Humacao Cultural Center and Fine Arts Museum | | Humacao | Art | Municipal art museum, cultural center and event venue located in the former Rafael Carmoega-designed district courthouse. |
| Joaquin de Rojas House Museum | | Barranquitas | Local history | Small history museum located in the Barranquitas municipal office of culture and tourism. |
| José Celso Barbosa House Museum | | Bayamón | Biographical | Biographical museum in the former birthplace and residence of politician and "Father of the Puerto Rico Statehood movement" José Celso Barbosa. Operated by the Institute of Puerto Rican Culture. |
| José PH. Hernández Poster Museum | | Río Grande | Art | Small museum dedicated to the art of making posters and banners. |
| José Rafael Gilot Museum of the History of Juana Díaz | | Juana Díaz | Local history | Small municipal local history museum of Juana Díaz. |
| Juan Antonio Corretjer Museum | | Ciales | Biographical | Museum dedicated to the life and work of poet Juan Antonio Corretjer, also hosts a library and event center. |
| La Casa Blanca | | San Juan | Local history | Fortified residence of Juan Ponce de León and the Ponce de León family. Operated by the Institute of Puerto Rican Culture. |
| La Cueva del Indio Ceremonial Center Museum | | Las Piedras | Archaeology | Small museum that interprets the bateyes and indigenous petroglyphs of the site. |
| La Princesa Prison – ICPR and Puerto Rico Tourism Company Exhibition Hall | | San Juan | Art | Small gallery and temporary art exhibition hall at the headquarters of the Puerto Rico Tourism Company on the former La Princesa Prison. |
| Lares Museum of Historical Resources | | Lares | Local history | Municipal archives and local history museum. |
| Las Cabezas de San Juan Lighthouse Museum | | Fajardo | Natural history | Small natural history and ecology museum located in the historic Cape San Juan Lighthouse, within the Las Cabezas de San Juan Nature Reserve, operated by the Conservation Trust of Puerto Rico. |
| Machín–Ramos Residence Museum | | San Lorenzo | Historic house | Museum and headquarters of the Municipal Department of Art, Culture and Tourism of San Lorenzo located in one of the oldest residences of the region. |
| Mariana Bracetti Museum | | Lares | Art | Small museum that showcases local arts and crafts. |
| Miramar Art & Design Museum | | San Juan | Art | Art museum with an emphasis on design, local architecture and contemporary art. |
| Mundillo Museum | | Moca | Art | Museum that showcases the celebrated local bobbin lace technique. |
| MUSAN: Museum of Santos and National Art | | San Juan | Art | Small folk-art museum with an emphasis on the crafting of santos, small religious statues depicting saints and Biblical figures. |
| Museum of Archaeology, History and Epigraphy of Guayanilla | | Guayanilla | Multiple | Multidisciplinary museum with exhibitions on the history, culture, arts and crafts of Guayanilla. |
| Museum of Art and History of Carolina | | Carolina | Art | Municipal museum focusing on the art history of Carolina. |
| Museum of Art of Aguadilla | | Aguadilla | Art | Small municipal art museum and event venue located in the former Rafael Carmoega-designed district court house. |
| Museum of Art of Aguadilla and the Caribbean | | Aguadilla | Art | Art museum located in a historic early 20th-century house. |
| Museum of Art of Puerto Rico | | San Juan | Art | One of the largest art museums in Puerto Rico dedicated to Puerto Rican, Latin American and Puerto-Rican American art. Located in a former hospital it also hosts restaurants, a sculpture garden and event venues. |
| Museum of Entomology and Tropical Biodiversity | | San Juan | Natural history | Small museum showcasing the insect life of Puerto Rico and the wider tropical ecosystems of the Caribbean. Located within the University of Puerto Rico Botanical Garden. |
| Museum of Guánica | | Guánica | Multiple | Multidisciplinary museum with exhibitions on the history, culture, arts and crafts of Guánica. |
| Museum of History, Anthropology and Art of the University of Puerto Rico | | San Juan | Multiple | Located in the University of Puerto Rico, Río Piedras campus, this is the oldest and first purpose-built museum in Puerto Rico, located in a Modernist building designed by Henry Klumb. The interdisciplinary museum has permanent art, anthropology, archaeology exhibits with important pieces such as Francisco Oller's El Velorio and one of the 1868 Lares revolt flags. |
| Museum of Natural History of Puerto Rico | | Aguadilla | Natural history | First comprehensive natural history museum in Puerto Rico housing fossil collections, and animal and plant specimens. |
| Museum of Optometry of the Interamerican University of Puerto Rico | | Bayamón | Medical | Small museum dedicated to optometry and the history of eye medicine in Puerto Rico. Part of the Interamerican University of Puerto Rico's School of Optometry. |
| Museum of Pharmacy and Medicinal Plants of the University of Puerto Rico | | San Juan | Medical | Small museum dedicated to the history of pharmacy in Puerto Rico from indigenous times to modern day. Part of the University of Puerto Rico's School of Pharmacy. |
| Museum of Ponce Architecture | | Ponce | Architecture | Located in the famous Wiechers-Villaronga House, it showcases the history of Puerto Rican and Ponce architecture with an emphasis of the development of the Isabelino Neoclassical and Ponce Creole styles. Operated by the Institute of Puerto Rican Culture. |
| Museum of Puerto Rican Autonomism | | Ponce | Human rights | Small museum located within the Román Baldorioty de Castro National Pantheon dedicated to the history of Puerto Rican autonomism and self-governance. |
| Museum of Puerto Rican Music | | Ponce | Music | Located in the Casa Serrallés, a comprehensive museum dedicated to the music of Puerto Rico. |
| Museum of San Juan | | San Juan | Local history | Multidisciplinary museum housed in the historic former marketplace of Old San Juan with exhibits on the history of San Juan throughout its settlement in 1508, its foundation in 1521 and its colonial history up to 1898. |
| Museum of the Americas | | San Juan | Multiple | Located in the Ballajá Barracks, it showcases the history, art and culture of the Americas from its indigenous beginnings, throughout its colonization and modern cultural developments. It also hosts several sub-departmental museums such as the Indigenous Museum (Museo del Indio). |
| Museum of the Conquest and Colonization of Puerto Rico | | Guaynabo | Archaeology | Small archaeological center that interprets the Caparra archaeological site in the context of the European colonization of Puerto Rico and the Spanish settlement of the San Juan area. |
| Museum of the Hammock | | San Sebastián | Folk | Museum dedicated to the art of hammock crafting located at a former marketplace. |
| Museum of the History of Ponce | | Ponce | Local history | History museum dedicated to the social ecology, economy, architecture, government, and elements of daily life in Ponce from its foundation to modern day. Located in the historic Salazar-Candal House and operated by the municipality of Ponce. |
| Museum of the Ponce Massacre | | Ponce | Human rights | Located on the site Ponce massacre with artifacts and memorabilia from said massacre which occurred on Palm Sunday on March 21, 1937. Operated by the Institute of Puerto Rican Culture. |
| Museum of the Próceres | | Cabo Rojo | Local history | Museum dedicated to the lives and work of distinguished figures from the history of Cabo Rojo. |
| Museum of the Sea | | San Juan | Maritime | Small private museum dedicated to the maritime history of Puerto Rico and the Caribbean. |
| Museum of the Train | | Isabela | Transportation | Transportation museum with emphasis on the history of railways in Puerto Rico and its importance to the local sugarcane industry. |
| Museum of Transportation of Puerto Rico | | Guaynabo | Transportation | Museum with automobiles, bicycles, motorcycles, horse-drawn carriages, ox wagons and much more on the history of transportation on the island. |
| Nemesio Canales Museum | | Jayuya | Biographical | Museum dedicated to the family of writer and activist Nemesio Canales and their contributions to Puerto Rico's history. |
| Óscar Colón Delgado Art and History Museum | | Hatillo | Multiple | Multidisciplinary museum dedicated to the history, culture, arts and crafts of Hatillo with a particular emphasis on the local vejigante traditions. |
| Pablo Casals Museum | | San Juan | Biographical | Dedicated to the life and work of cellist and composer Pablo Casals with a media and music library. |
| Palacete Los Moreau Museum | | Moca | Historic house | Historic manor house of the Hacienda Iruena sugarcane plantation, famous as the inspiration and setting to Enrique Laguerre's La Llamarada. |
| Parque de Bombas Museum | | Ponce | Firefighting | Museum dedicated to the history of firefighting in Ponce located in the famous Victorian landmark originally built for the 1882 Exhibition Trade Fair and later used as a firefighting station, temporary city hall and exhibition hall. |
| Parque de las Ciencias | | Bayamón | Science | Educational theme park and recreational area with a number of museums dedicated to automobiles, medicine, technology, rocketry, ecology, architecture, engineering and others. At one time it had a zoo, an aviary and a planetarium. |
| Photojournalism Museum of the Jewish Community Center of Puerto Rico | | San Juan | Multiple | Small museum dedicated to photojournalism with additional information on the local Jewish community and temporary exhibits and events in the Shaare Zedeck Synagogue, at a historic Antonin Nechodoma-designed Prairie School/Craftsman-style house. |
| Ponce Museum of Art | | Ponce | Art | Largest art museum in Puerto Rico and the Caribbean with a comprehensive collection on European, Puerto Rican and Latin American paintings with one of the largest Pre-Raphaelite collections in the Americas. First Puerto Rican museum to be accredited by the American Alliance of Museums. |
| Puerto Rican Athenaeum | | San Juan | Art | Includes an art gallery, theater, performance hall and library across two buildings in the Old San Juan and Puerta de Tierra historic districts. |
| Puerto Rico Museum of Contemporary Art | | San Juan | Art | Modern art museum located in the former Rafael M. Labra High School with a large permanent collection, temporary exhibits, events and workshops. |
| Puerto Rico Museum of Sports | | Salinas | Sports | Small sports history museum located on the grounds of the Albergue Olímpico Germán Rieckehoff, it also showcases the development of the Puerto Rico Olympic Committee and Puerto Rico's role in the Olympics. |
| Puerto Rico National Guard Museum | | San Juan | Military | Small military history museum located at the former headquarters of the Puerto Rico National Guard. |
| Punta Tuna Lighthouse Museum | | Maunabo | Maritime | Historic lighthouse museum with exhibits on the maritime history associated with the historic site. |
| Quebradillas Historical Museum | | Quebradillas | Local history | Small museum showcasing the local history through archaeological pieces, memorabilia and works of art. |
| Religious Art Museum of Porta Coeli | | San Germán | Art | Operated by the Institute of Puerto Rican Culture, colonial religious art museum located in a former Dominican Order convent that showcases pieces from Puerto Rico and Latin America. |
| Rafael Carrión Pacheco Exhibition Hall | | San Juan | Art | Performing and plastic arts institute with changing exhibits presented by Banco Popular de Puerto Rico. |
| San Juan Waterworks | | San Juan | Local history | Interprets the historic aqueduct and waterworks that made the settlement and development of Río Piedras possible, with an emphasis on the ecological value of the Piedras River ecosystem in a historical urban context. |
| Tibes Indigenous Ceremonial Center Museum | | Ponce | Archaeology | Archaeological site interpretative center and comprehensive archaeological museum with pieces uncovered both in-situ and throughout Puerto Rico and the Caribbean. |
| University of Puerto Rico Museum of Zoology | | San Juan | Natural history | Small university campus museum dedicated to zoology and natural history. |

== Former museums ==
- Casa Rosa, a historic house or barracks in San Juan, was for a time a museum used for Puerto Rican crafts
- Wildlife Museum of San Juan, municipal natural history museum

== See also ==
- Botanical gardens in Puerto Rico (category)
- Houses in Puerto Rico (category)
- Forts in Puerto Rico (category)
- Nature Centers in Puerto Rico
- Observatories in Puerto Rico (category)
- Registered Historic Places in Puerto Rico
