= List of the oldest buildings in Puerto Rico =

This article lists the oldest extant buildings in Puerto Rico, including extant buildings and structures constructed prior to and during the United States rule over Puerto Rico since Puerto Rico was annexed in 1898. Only buildings built prior to 1750 are suitable for inclusion on this list, or the building must be the oldest of its type.

In order to qualify for the list, a structure must:

- be a recognizable building (defined as any human-made structure used or intended for supporting or sheltering any use or continuous occupancy);
- incorporate features of building work from the claimed date to at least 1.5 metres (4.9 ft) in height and/or be a listed building.

This consciously excludes ruins of limited height, roads and statues. Bridges may be included if they otherwise fulfill the above criteria. Dates for many of the oldest structures have been arrived at by radiocarbon dating or dendrochronology and should be considered approximate. If the exact year of initial construction is estimated, it will be shown as a range of dates.

== List of oldest buildings ==
Building	Image	Location	First built	Use	Notes
La Casa Blanca		Old San Juan	1521	Military, residence	Located in the Old San Juan National Historic Landmark District. Built as a fortified residence for Juan Ponce de León. The house has been on U.S. territory since Puerto Rico was annexed in 1898.
San José Church		Old San Juan	1532	Religious	Located in the Old San Juan National Historic Landmark District. Oldest church building and oldest monastery in Puerto Rico. Additions and renovations over the centuries. The church has been on U.S. territory since Puerto Rico was annexed in 1898.
La Fortaleza		Old San Juan	1533	Government, military	Located in the Old San Juan National Historic Landmark District and designated a UNESCO World Heritage Site. Oldest executive mansion in the New World. Extensive reconstructions took place over the centuries.
Castillo San Felipe del Morro		Old San Juan	1539	Military	Part of the San Juan National Historic Site and a UNESCO World Heritage Site. Built to defend the eastern entrance to the San Juan Bay and the Islet of San Juan. Construction started in 1539, with extensive additions over the centuries.
Cathedral of San Juan Bautista		Old San Juan	1540	Religious	Located in the Old San Juan National Historic Landmark District. Oldest church building in the U.S. and its territories, original built in 1521 on modern-day location (extensive additions and renovations). The cathedral has been on U.S. territory since Puerto Rico was annexed in 1898.
Basilica of the Virgin of Monserrat		Hormigueros	c. 1570	Religious	Radiocarbon dating on the building foundations and the inner chapel dates to ca. 1570. The current church building was built during the second half of the 18th century.
San Juan City Hall		Old San Juan	1604-1789	Government	Oldest building used as a city hall in Puerto Rico, first built as the Cabildo de Puerto Rico. The main structure was built in stages between 1604 and 1789. The façade dates to 1840.
Porta Coeli		San Germán	1609	Religious	The church has been on US territory since Puerto Rico was annexed in 1898. Located in San Germán Historic District.
Fortín San Juan de la Cruz		Toa Baja	1610-1660	Military	Part of the San Juan National Historic Site and a UNESCO World Heritage Site. Built between 1610 and 1660 at the site of a former small wooden fortification which defended the western entrance to the San Juan Bay and the original mouth of the Bayamón River.
Castillo San Cristóbal		Old San Juan	1634-1790	Military	Part of the San Juan National Historic Site and a UNESCO World Heritage Site. Largest Spanish fortification to be built in the New World, constructed to provide simultaneous land and sea support to the eastern end of the San Juan City Wall.
Monasterio del Señor San José de la Orden de Nuestra Señora del Carmen		Old San Juan	1646-1651	Religious	Former nunnery and monastery founded in 1651, today a hotel known as Hotel El Convento. The current exterior dates to the second half of the 19th century.
Iglesia San Blas de Illescas		Coamo	1661	Religious	Considered one of the most important works of religious architecture in Puerto Rico. The church has been on US territory since Puerto Rico was annexed in 1898.
Hermitage Church of Nuestra Señora de Valvanera of Coamo		Coamo	1685	Religious	Brick masonry chapel from 1685. The church has been on U.S. territory since Puerto Rico was annexed in 1898.
Iglesia San Germán de Auxerre		San Germán	1688	Religious	This parish church was built in 1688. The church has been on U.S. territory since Puerto Rico was annexed in 1898.
Church Nuestra Señora de la Candelaria y San Matías of Manatí		Manatí	1729	Religious	Originally in 1729 and underwent major repairs in 1864. The church has been on U.S. territory since Puerto Rico was annexed in 1898.
Parroquia del Espiritu Santo y San Patricio		Loíza	1729	Religious	This parish church was built in 1729. The church has been on U.S. territory since Puerto Rico was annexed in 1898.
Nuestra Señora de las Mercedes de San Miguel de Hato Grande		San Lorenzo	1737	Religious	Also known as Las Mercedes Church, this Classical Revival style building was built in 1737. The church has been on U.S. territory since Puerto Rico was annexed in 1898.
Alejandro Tapia y Rivera Theater		Old San Juan	1824	Theater	Oldest free-standing theater in San Juan and one of the oldest theaters in the Caribbean.
La Princesa Prison		Old San Juan	1837	Prison	Oldest purpose-built prison in Puerto Rico.
Ponce City Hall		Ponce	1840	Government	Oldest purpose-built city hall in Puerto Rico and oldest surviving building Ponce.
United States Customs House in Ponce		Ponce	1842	Government	Oldest U.S. customs house in Puerto Rico and the only one of its type under the U.S. flag. Possibly also the oldest purpose-built post office in Puerto Rico.
Casa de los Ponce de León		San Germán	1842	Residence	Allegedly the oldest continuously occupied home in Puerto Rico; home to Ponce De Leon family. Located in San Germán Historic District. The house has been on U.S. territory since Puerto Rico was annexed in 1898.
Port San Juan Light		Old San Juan	1846	Lighthouse	Oldest lighthouse structure in Puerto Rico. Built onto El Morro, which is part the San Juan National Historic Site and a UNESCO World Heritage Site.
Central San Vicente		Vega Baja	1873	Refinery	First sugarcane refinery to be built in Puerto Rico. Although most of the building is in ruins, its chimney and central brick structure and steam engines still remain.
Iglesia de la Santísima Trinidad		Ponce	1873	Religious	Oldest non-Roman Catholic religious building and oldest Anglican and Protestant church building in Puerto Rico. Holy Trinity was still the only Protestant church in Puerto Rico at the time of the United States invasion in 1898. The current structure dates to 1926 and it preserves some of its former features such as its 1870 bell cast.
Cape San Juan Light		Fajardo	1880	Lighthouse	Oldest free-standing lighthouse building in Puerto Rico. It played a major role in the Battle of Fajardo during the Puerto Rican Campaign of the Spanish–American War in 1898.
Logia Masónica Hijos de la Luz		Yauco	1894	Meeting hall	Possibly the oldest built and certainly the oldest surviving purpose-built Masonic building in Puerto Rico.
Yagüez Theater		Mayagüez	1909	Theater	Oldest surviving purpose-built movie theater in Puerto Rico.
Jose V. Toledo Federal Building and United States Courthouse		Old San Juan	1914	Government	Oldest U.S.-built post office, courthouse and federal building in Puerto Rico.
Ponce High School		Ponce	1915	Education	Oldest purpose-built public school and high school building in Puerto Rico.
Condado Vanderbilt Hotel		Santurce	1919	Hotel	First purpose-built luxury hotel and hotel casino in Puerto Rico.
Museum of History, Anthropology and Art of the University of Puerto Rico		Río Piedras	1951	Museum	Oldest purpose-built museum building in Puerto Rico.

== See also ==
- National Register of Historic Places listings in Puerto Rico
- History of Puerto Rico
- Oldest buildings in the United States
