= Porta Caribe =

Tourism region in southern Puerto Rico

- Porta Caribe area shown in red
- Formation: May 2009
- Type: Government-owned agency
- Legal status: Statutory
- Purpose: Tourism & Culture
- Headquarters: Calle Villa #122
- Location: Ponce, Puerto Rico
- Coordinates: 18.01106°N 66.61452°W
- Region served: Southern Puerto Rico
- Director: Tito Reyes (2018 - Incumbent)
- Key people: Past directors: Jose A. Reyes (2009-12); Nadine de Jesús (2012-15); Maritza W. Ruiz Cabán (2015-17)
- Parent organization: Puerto Rico Tourism Company
- Budget: $1 million
- Website: www.portacaribe.com

Porta Caribe is a tourism region in southern Puerto Rico. It was established in 2003 by the Puerto Rico Tourism Company, an agency of the Government of Puerto Rico. When created in 2003 it consisted of 14 municipalities in the south central zone (Adjuntas, Arroyo, Coamo, Guayama, Guayanilla, Jayuya, Juana Diaz, Patillas, Peñuelas, Ponce, Salinas, Santa Isabel, Villaba, Yauco). With the creation of the neighboring Porta Cordillera zone in July 2012, the municipalities of Adjuntas and Jayuya were transferred to the newly created Porta Cordillera zone and Porta Caribe became a 12-municipality tourism region. The name Porta Caribe translates to "Doorway to the Caribbean." Its executive director is Maritza W. Ruiz Cabán.

== History ==
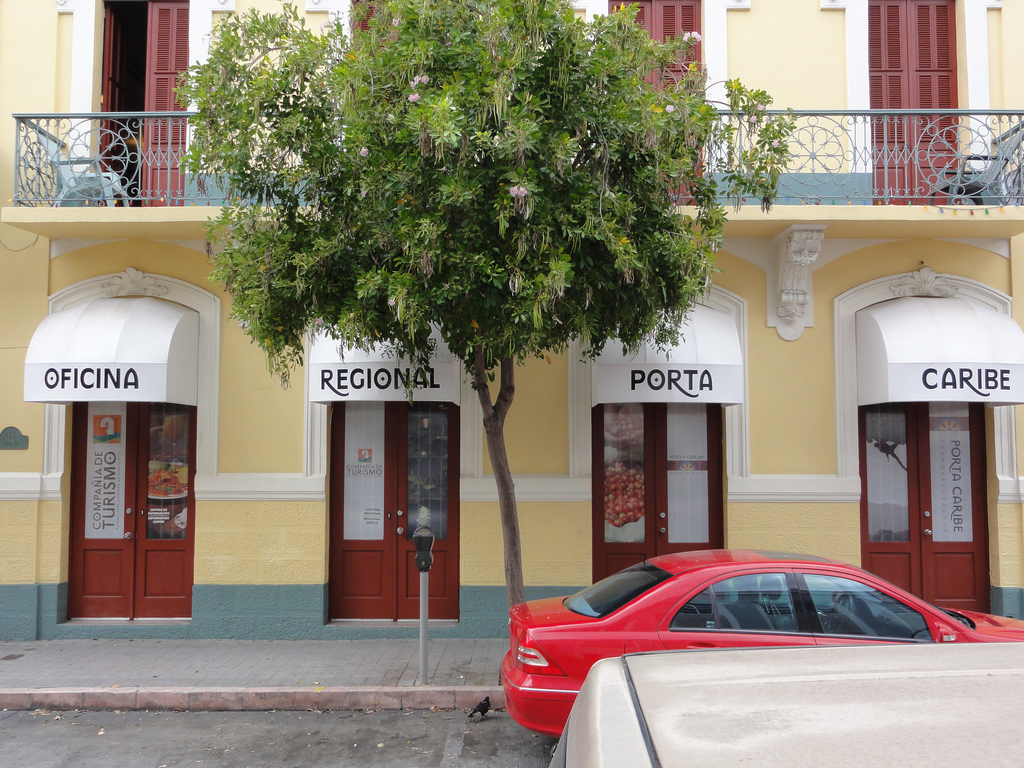
Porta Caribe headquarters on Villa street

The southern region of Puerto Rico had traditionally been considered to consist of 16 municipalities. The establishment of the Porta Caribe region dates to the late 1990s when two bills to the effect were brought before the Puerto Rico Legislature, but failing to garnish the necessary number of votes in both occasions. The region was finally established by Executive Order of Governor Aníbal Acevedo Vilá in May, 2006. Initially the region consisted of 15 municipalities, but Guanica was subsequently officially moved to join the Porta del Sol. A budget of $1 million USD was initially assigned to promote tourism for the Porta Caribe region. The director of the Government of Puerto Rico's Puerto Rico Tourism Company called Porta Caribe "Puerto Rico's second tourist destination."

== Inventory ==
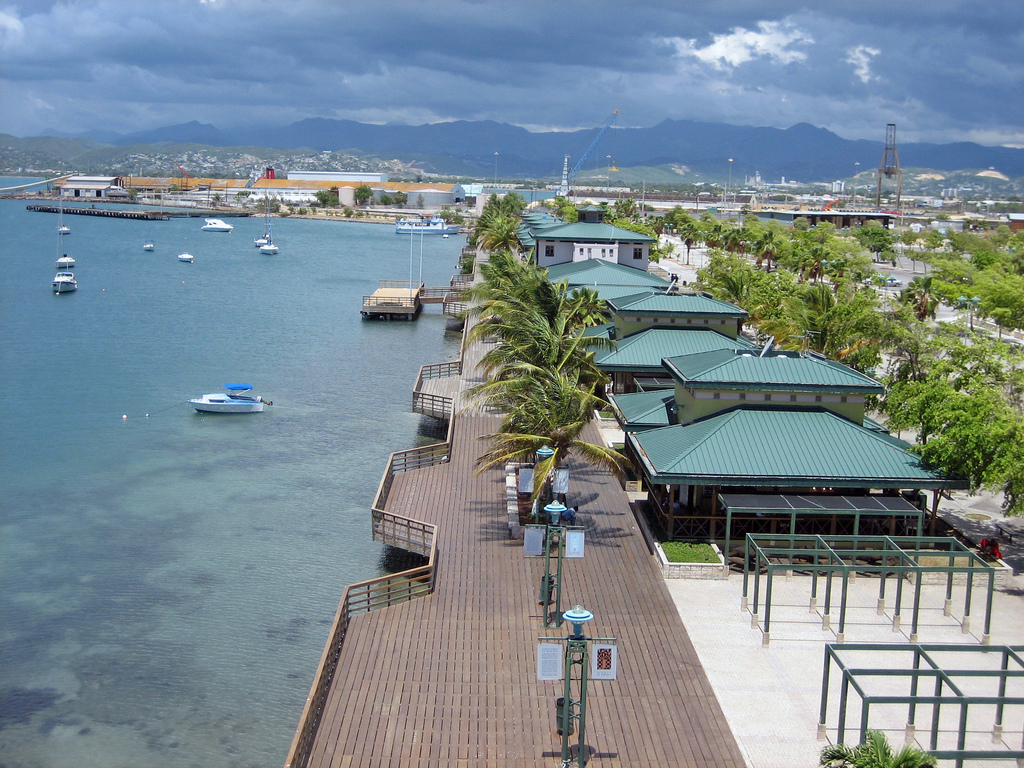
La Guancha facing the Caribbean Sea in Ponce

In 2006, the region already provided the following facilities to launch it as a tourist destination:

- An international airport, Mercedita Airport, that saw a traffic of 124,774 passengers in 2005
- A cruise ship pier, Port of the Americas
- 1,100 hotel rooms (increasing to 1,691 by 2008)

In addition, the Oficina del Plan de Usos de Terrenos (Office of Land Use Planning) of the Government of Puerto Rico lists 24 officially recognized beaches in the southern region of Puerto Rico. Though by necessity it includes coastal municipalities only, they are all part of the Porta Caribe region.

As of 17 October 2012, the Porta Caribe zone boasted 61 lodging facilities, 292 restaurants and 328 tourist attractions.

== Attractions ==
=== Top attractions ===
This is a list of the top attractions in Porta Caribe, according to the Puerto Rico Tourism Company.

- "Charco Azul" - Carite State Forest, Coamo
- Caja de Muertos Island, Ponce
- Casa Cautiño Museum, Guayama

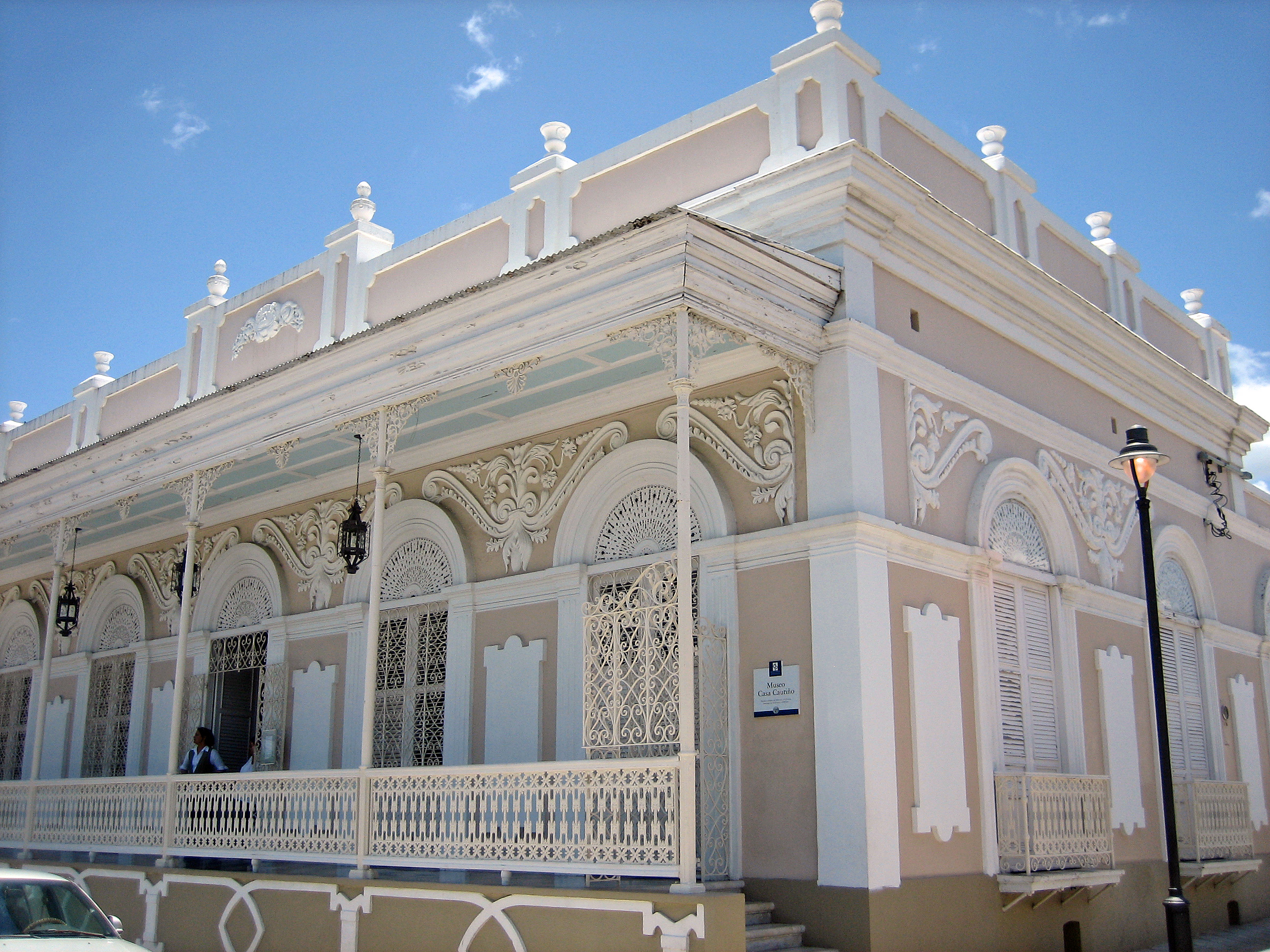
Cabinetmaking museum Casa Cautiño in Guayama

- La Cruceta del Vigía & Japanese Garden, Ponce
- La Guancha Boardwalk, Ponce
- Hacienda Buena Vista, Ponce
- Historic Firehouse, Ponce
- Castillo Serrallés, Ponce
- Tibes - Native Indian Museum, Ponce

=== Other attractions ===
- Arroyo
  - Faro Punta de las Figuras
  - Tren del Sur
- Coamo
  - Los Baños de Coamo (Coamo Thermal Baths)
  - Church San Blas de Illescas of Coamo

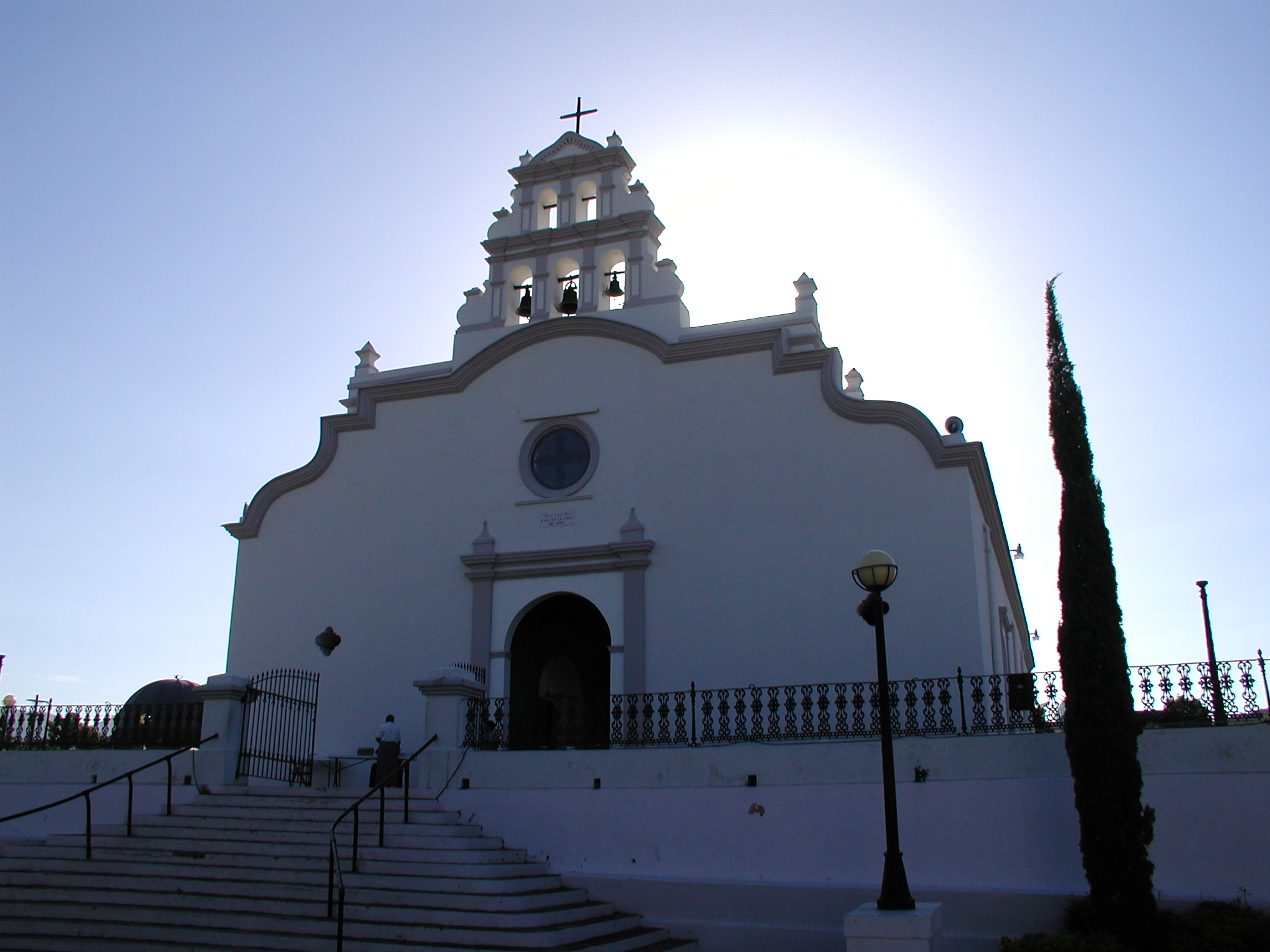
San Blas de Illescas Church in Coamo

- Guayama
  - Hacienda Azucarera Vives
  - Carite Dam
- Guayanilla
  - Mario Mercado Castle
  - La Ventana Beach
- Juana Diaz
  - Three Kings Festival
  - Efraín Daleccio Caves
- Patillas
  - Parador Caribbean Paradise
  - Villa Pesquera Beach
- Peñuelas
  - Guilarte Forest
  - Unknown Soldier Monument
- Ponce
  - Ponce Grand Prix
  - Ponce Carnival
- Salinas
  - Albergue Olímpico
  - Antigua Central Aguirre (Sugar Cane Mill)
- Santa Isabel
  - Jauca Beach
  - Patron Celebrations
- Villaba
  - Toro Negro Forest Reserve
  - Areyto Festival
- Yauco
  - Architecture
    - Casa Franceschi Antongiorgi
    - Casa Filardi
    - Teatro Ideal
  - Lake Luchetti
  - Pico Rodadero
  - National Coffee Festival (Festival Nacional del Café) - February
  - Yaucromatic

=== Southern Ecological Tourist Zone ===
In July 2016, Governor Alejandro García Padilla signed into law Puerto Rico House Bill 2834 creating the Zona Turística Ecológica del Sur (English: Southern Ecological Tourist Zone) composed of a four municipalities in the Porta Caribe tourist region, Peñuelas, Guayanilla, Yauco and Guánica, to highlight the high ecological value of that area, and their contributions in the areas of dry forests, caves, diversity of water forms and coffee haciendas.

== Similar groupings ==
In October 2011, Governor Luis Fortuno created what he called "Ruta del Sur" (English: Southern Route) in a political move to show support for the infrastructural development of the municipalities in southern Puerto Rico. Ruta del Sur included the nine municipalities of Guánica, Yauco, Ponce, Guayanilla, Peñuelas, Arroyo, Salinas, Juana Díaz y Santa Isabel. One of its goals is the development of ecotourism.

DISUR, which stands for "Desarrollo Integral del Sur" (English: Southern Integral Development) is a private organization created in 2006 that seeks to "promote and maximize the competitiveness of the municipalities that make up the southern region of Puerto Rico." It consists of 15 southern municipalities as follows: Adjuntas, Arroyo, Coamo, Guánica, Guayama, Guayanilla, Jayuya, Juana Díaz, Patillas, Peñuelas, Ponce, Salinas, Santa Isabel, Villalba y Yauco. The organization seeks to make strides in the area of tourism by promoting conventions as well as the Centro Oceanografico de Ponce.

The College of Surveyors of Puerto Rico created the "Ruta Agrícola" (English: Agricultural Route) which runs from Salinas, through Santa Isabel and Juana Diaz, and ending in Ponce. Its purpose is "to create a new magnet for tourism".

The Oficina del Plan de Usos de Terrenos (Office of Land Use Planning) of the Government of Puerto Rico defines the Southern Region as including the 10 municipalities of Arroyo, Coamo, Guayama, Guayanilla, Juana Díaz, Peñuelas, Ponce, Salinas, Santa Isabel and Yauco.

== See also ==
- National Register of Historic Places listings in Porta Caribe
- Beaches of Porta Caribe
