= Iglesia San Germán de Auxerre =

Historic church in San Germán, Puerto Rico

San Germán de Auxerre Church
- Parish Church of San Germán de Auxerre
- Parroquia de San Germán de Auxerre
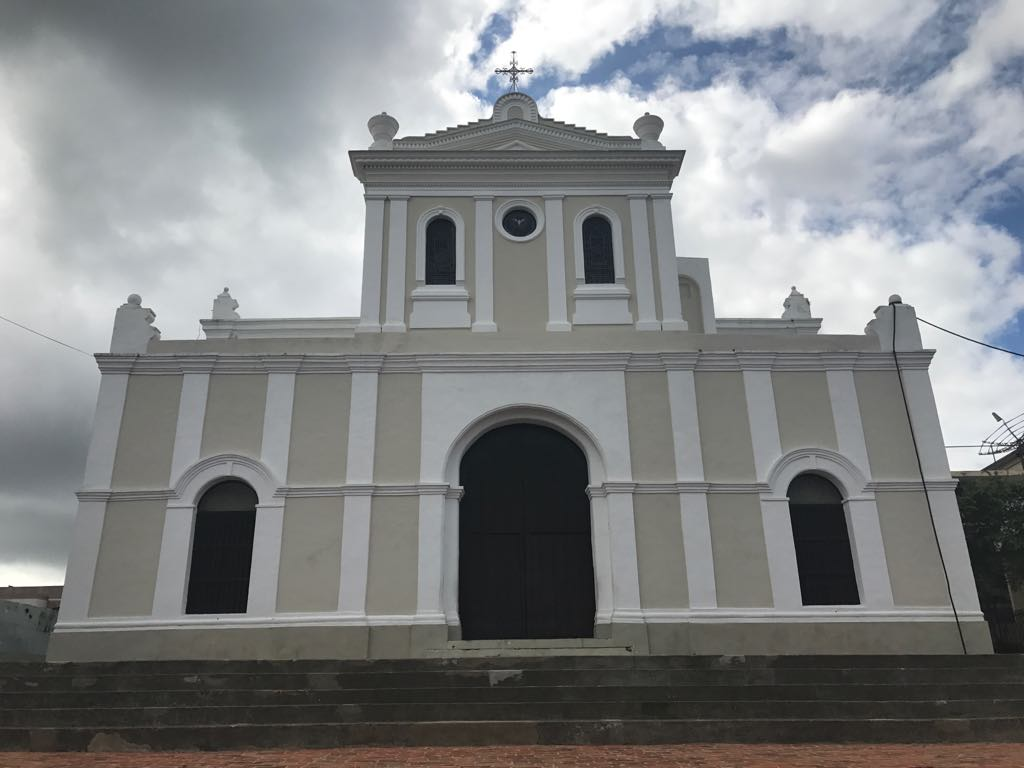
- Church façade in 2018

- Location in Puerto Rico
- 18°04′57″N 67°02′38″W
- Location: San Germán Pueblo, San Germán
- Address: De la Cruz Street and town plaza San Germán, Puerto Rico
- Country: Puerto Rico
- Denomination: Roman Catholic Church
- Website: diocesisdemayaguez.org/parroquia-san-german-de-auxerre

History
- Status: Parish church
- Founded: 1510
- Founder: Alonso Manso
- Dedication: Germanus of Auxerre
- Dedicated: 1573

Architecture
- Heritage designation: NRHP
- Designated: 1984
- Architect: Jean Puig
- Architectural type: Neoclassical Baroque
- Years built: 1688, 1737
- Completed: 1688

Administration
- Diocese: Mayagüez
- Church San Germán Auxerre of San Germán
- U.S. National Register of Historic Places
- U.S. Historic district – Contributing property
- Part of: San Germán Historic District (ID94000084)
- NRHP reference No.: 84000461
- Added to NRHP: December 10, 1984

The San Germán de Auxerre Church (Spanish: Iglesia San Germán de Auxerre) is a historic Roman Catholic parish church located in San Germán, Puerto Rico, overlooking its main town square. First built 1688, the current Baroque church has undergone numerous reconstructions and modifications after enduring numerous earthquakes throughout its lifespan. The church is a listed component of the San Germán Historic District and it was listed in the National Register of Historic Places in 1984 as part of the Historic Churches of Puerto Rico multiple property submission (MPS).

== History ==
Spanish settlers under Bishop Alonso Manso founded the settlement of Nueva Salamanca and its parish in 1510 in an attempt to colonize the southwestern regions of Puerto Rico. This settlement was officially founded as La Villa de San Germán de Auxerre de Nueva Salamanca in 1573, named in honor of Germanus of Auxerre, namesake of Queen Germaine de Foix, second wife of King Ferdinand II of Aragon. The town was established centered around the first stone church at its center together with a cabildo and a hospital built on a flat plateau of the Santa Marta Hills by the Guanajibo River overlooking the Sabana Grande Valley.

The current church structure was built in 1688 after the destruction of its previous wooden and masonry iterations and repaired and reconstructed numerous between 1717 and 1739 after damages caused by numerous hurricanes and earthquakes during the 17th and 18th centuries. Originally built in a Gothic style, the current Baroque architecture dates to its 1737 reconstruction after two particularly destructive earthquakes in 1717 and 1737. The building sustained some further minor damages after a 1787 earthquake but it did not require nor suffer from any further major reconstruction. Notable of this Baroque reconstruction are its lavish trompe-l'œil frescoes that imitate wood coffers on the ceiling. The vault and arches are also painted in the trompe-l'œil manner.

Between 1834 and 1897, new repairs and modifications were made to the building, including its altar. The church today preserves the 1869 marble altar as well as ten other 19th century smaller secondary marble altars. A collection of 17th-century metalwork, 18th-century wooden carvings, and a painting by José Campeche are kept in the choir loft. The parish church sustained major damage during the 1918 earthquake, prompting revitalization procedures in 1920 and the reconstruction of its main tower in 1939. The church was managed by the Augustinians between 1896 and 1991.

It is one of 31 Puerto Rican churches reviewed for listing on the National Register of Historic Places in 1984 as part of the Historic Churches of Puerto Rico multiple property submission (MPS). It was also included in the San Germán Historic District, listed on the National Register on February 16, 1994, and on the Puerto Rico Register of Historic Sites and Zones in 1994.

== Gallery ==
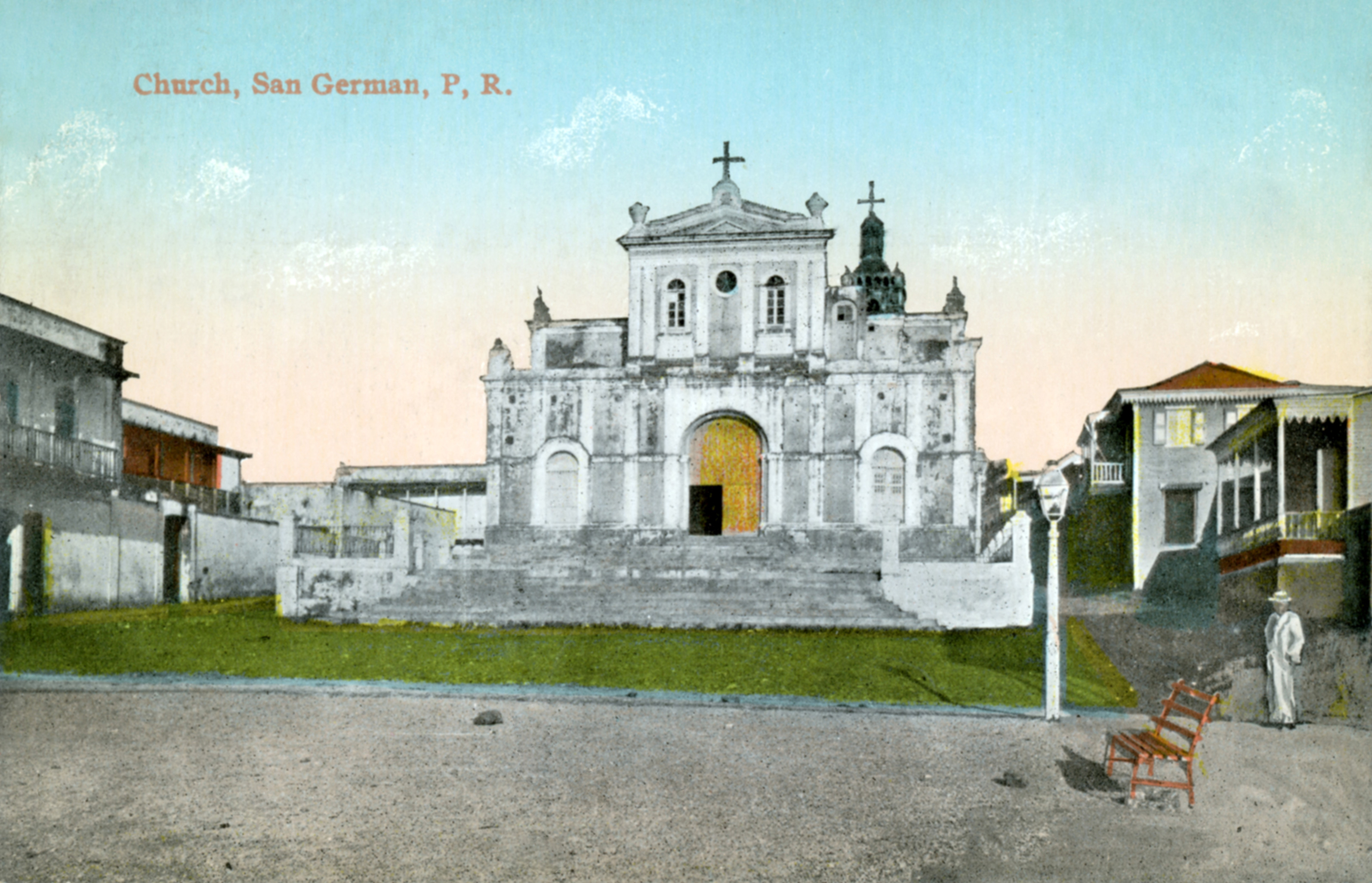
1914 postcard of the church

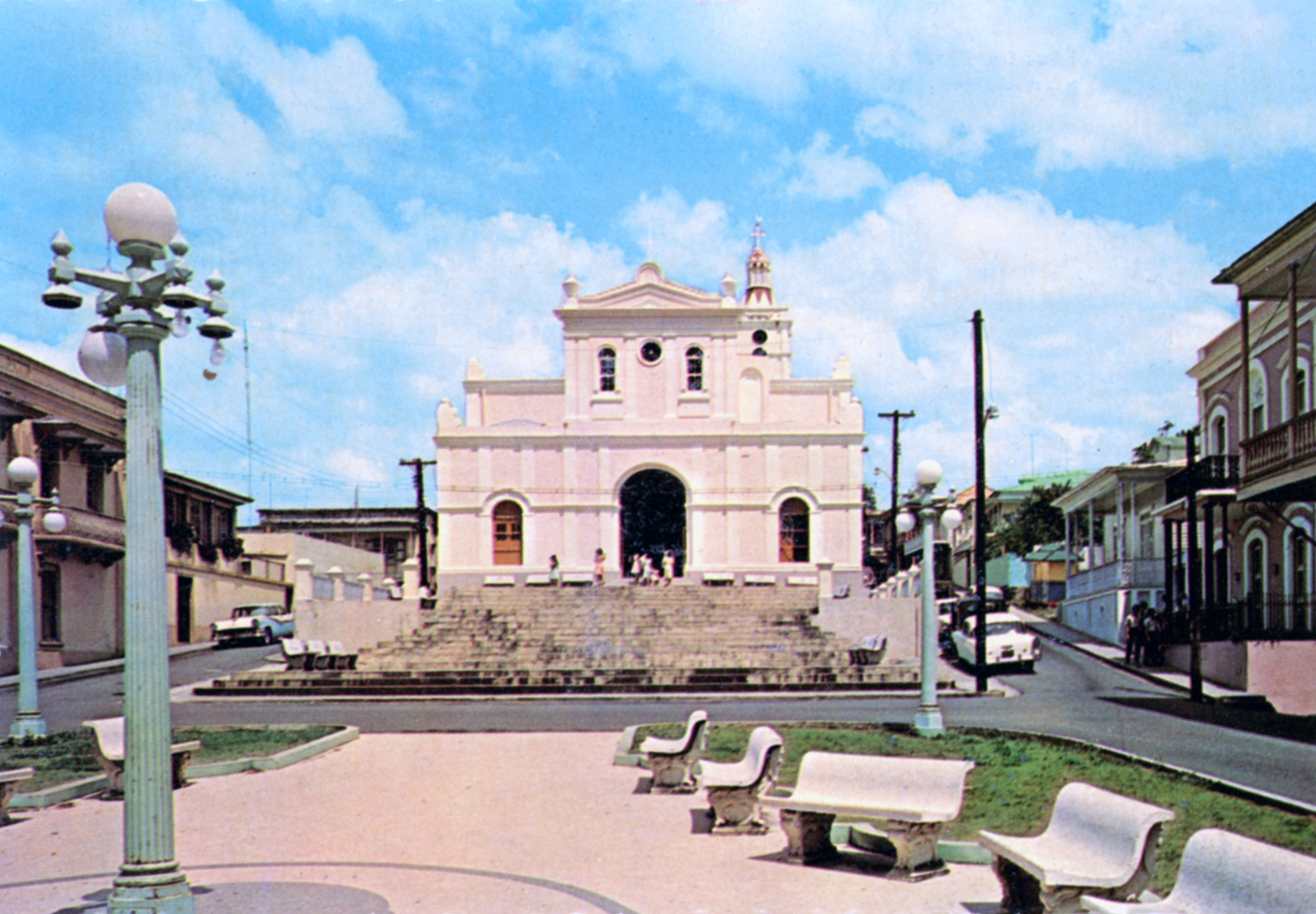
The church in 1964

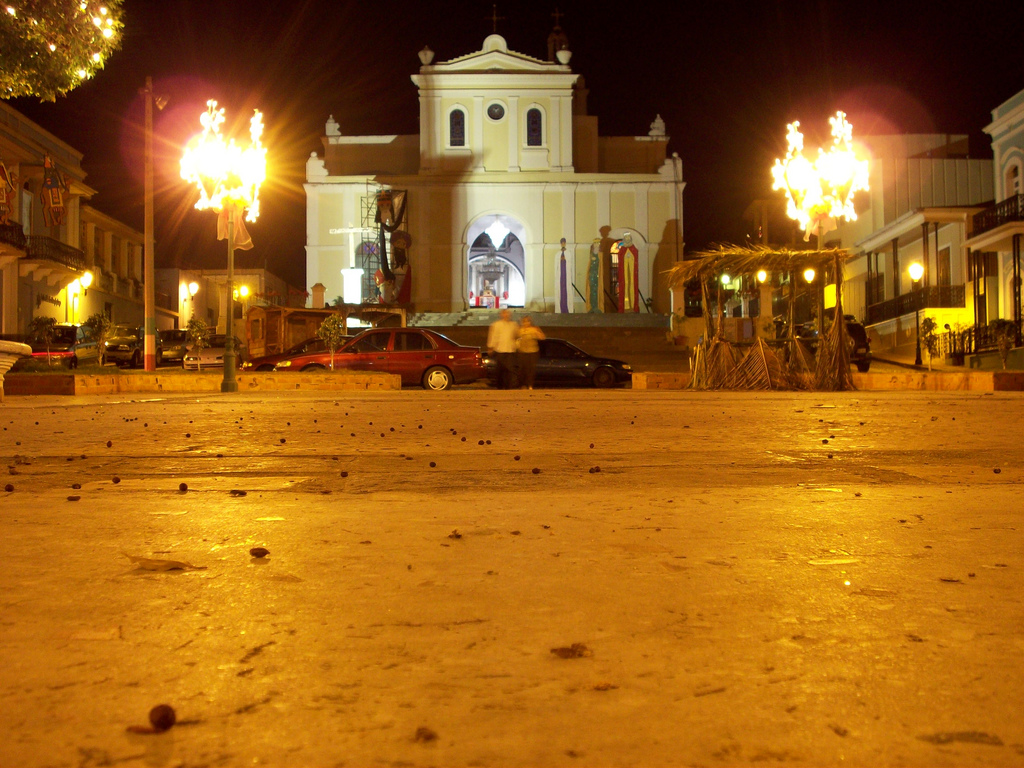
The church in 2009

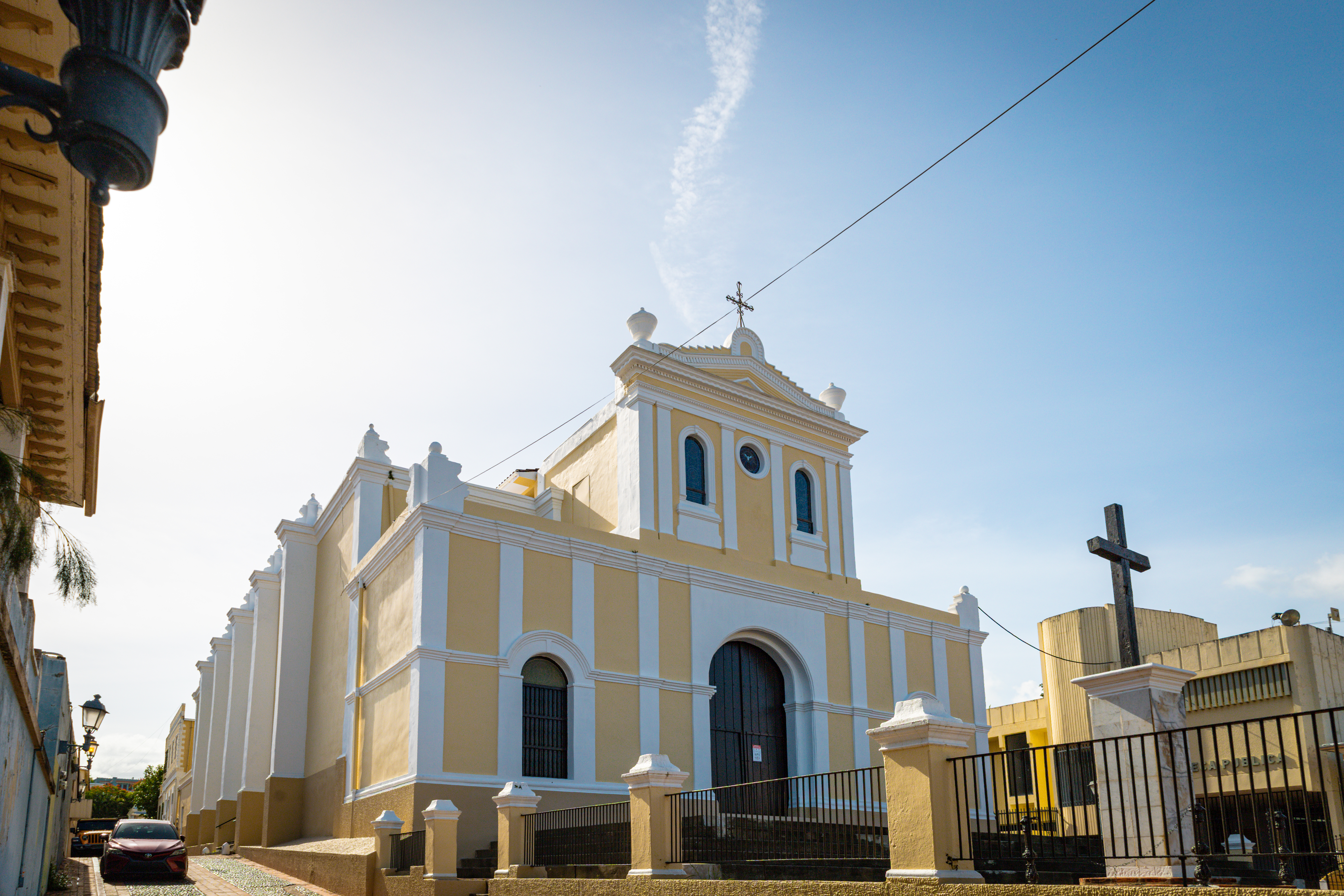
The church in 2025

== See also ==
- Porta Coeli
- San Germán Historic District
- List of the oldest buildings in Puerto Rico
