= Bayamón Museum of Art =

- Established: June 14, 1991; 33 years ago
- Location: Bayamón, Puerto Rico
- Coordinates: 18.4109°N 66.1612°W
- Type: Art Museum
- Website: www.museodeartedebayamon.com

The Bayamón Museum of Art (Spanish: Museo de Arte de Bayamón) is a museum located in Bayamón, Puerto Rico. The museum is dedicated to exhibiting works of art from Puerto Rico.

== History ==
In 1991, the museum was inaugurated with the purpose of preserving and disseminating art to the population of Puerto Rico, the collections were donated by Amelia Agustini. In 2003, the museum obtained more works of art from Puerto Rican artists. In 2010, the museum closed temporarily for renovations. In 2012, the renovations were completed and the museum reopened.

== Collections ==
The museum contains works of abstract and contemporary art, as well as museum exhibits explaining the beginnings of art in Puerto Rico. The museum contains photographs and sculptures. The museum has contained art pieces by artists Arnaldo Roche Rabell, Lope Max Díaz, Cecilio Colón Guzmán, Isabel Bernal, Antonio Navia, Linda Sánchez Pintor and Alana Iturralde León.
