= Los Túneles subterráneos de San Germán =

Tunnels in San Germán, Puerto Rico

- Alcantarilla Pluvial sobre la Quebrada Manzanares
- U.S. National Register of Historic Places
- U.S. Historic district – Contributing property
- Puerto Rico Historic Sites and Zones
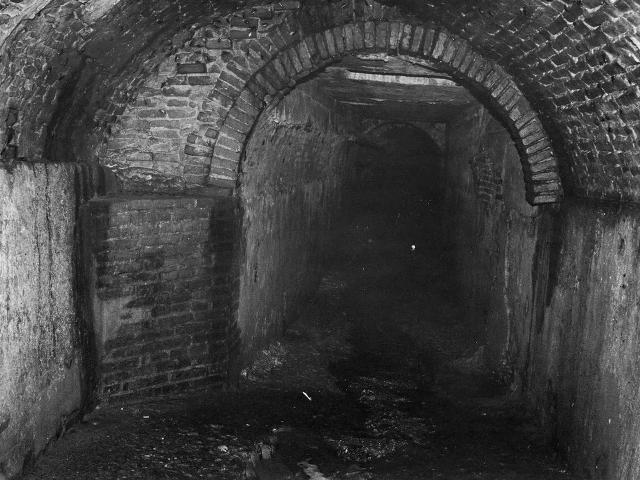
- Location: Extending from approximately the junction of Ferrocarril and Esperanza Streets to approximately the junction of Javilla and Ensanche Streets (Note: The Alcantarilla Pluvial sobre la Quebrada Manzanares is a linear resource; the coordinates given represent the approximate midpoint of the line.); San German, Puerto Rico
- Coordinates: 18°04′54″N 67°02′33″W
- Area: 0.5 acres (0.20 ha)
- Built: 1835
- Part of: San Germán Historic District (ID94000084)
- NRHP reference No.: 90000552
- RNSZH No.: 2000-(RO)-19-JP-SH

Significant dates
- Added to NRHP: April 12, 1990
- Designated RNSZH: December 21, 2000

The San Germán Underground (Spanish: Túneles subterráneos de San Germán) is a vaulted brick storm sewer system built in 1835 underneath the urban center of San Germán, Puerto Rico. The system is made of a central tunnel and several smaller side tunnels. The construction is of brick and rubble with modern concrete repairs. The main part of the system covers the underground course of Quebrada Manzanares from its headwaters to its resurgence as a surface stream, 842.53 metres (2,764.2 ft) away. The vaulted brick branches, most of them abandoned and sealed, date mostly from before 1910. The tunnel sections built up to 1918 are listed on the National Register of Historic Places as Alcantarilla Pluvial sobre la Quebrada Manzanares.

== See also ==
- San Germán Historic District
