= Arnaldo Roche Rabell =

- Born: December 5, 1955; San Juan, Puerto Rico
- Died: November 17, 2018 (aged 62); San Juan, Puerto Rico
- Resting place: Santa María Magdalena de Pazzis Cemetery
- Education: Luchetti School of Art
- Alma mater: Art Institute of Chicago (MFA)
- Known for: Painting
- Style: Neo-expressionism
- Movement: Neo-expressionist movement

Arnaldo Roche Rabell (December 5, 1955 – November 17, 2018) was a Puerto Rican painter, described as "one of the most important artists of the neo-expressionist movement".

Born in San Juan, Puerto Rico. He was educated at the Luchetti School of Art in San Juan, Puerto Rico, later studying architecture at the University of Puerto Rico before graduating with an MFA at the Art Institute of Chicago in 1984.

Roche Rabell became known for his textured, sensual neo-expressionist paintings which often dealt with themes of memory, political turbulence, and consciousness, as well as the medium of painting itself. He developed a technique of rubbing or scratching away the layers of paint to create his images.

Roche Rabell's work can be found in the permanent collections of the Miami Museum of Art, and the Museum of Contemporary Art in San Juan and the Metropolitan Museum of Art in New York.

Roche Rabell died on November 17, 2018, in San Juan, Puerto Rico, after suffering from lung cancer. He was buried at Santa María Magdalena de Pazzis Cemetery. Following the passing of Arnaldo Roche Rabell, his estate officially appointed Galería Botello as the exclusive representative of his work. This includes legal authority over matters related to certificates of authenticity and the verification of his artworks.

In November 2025 The estate of Arnaldo Roche Rabell appointed L’Artban as the representative of the artist's work.Among its various activities, L’Artban will be responsible for documenting and cataloging the works of Arnaldo Roche Rabell, creating a catalog raisonné, and organizing traveling exhibitions to preserve, document, and continue disseminating the work of one of the key figures in contemporary art. On the other hand, Galería Botello, where Roche Rabell began his artistic career, will continue with the activities it has carried out to date in relation to the works of Arnaldo Roche Rabell in Puerto Rico. This collaborative effort is an essential step toward strengthening the presence and recognition of Arnaldo Roche Rabell, a transcendental artist both in the visual arts of Puerto Rico and internationally.
