= Residencia Don Andrés Hernández =

Puerto Rico historic place

- U.S. National Register of Historic Places
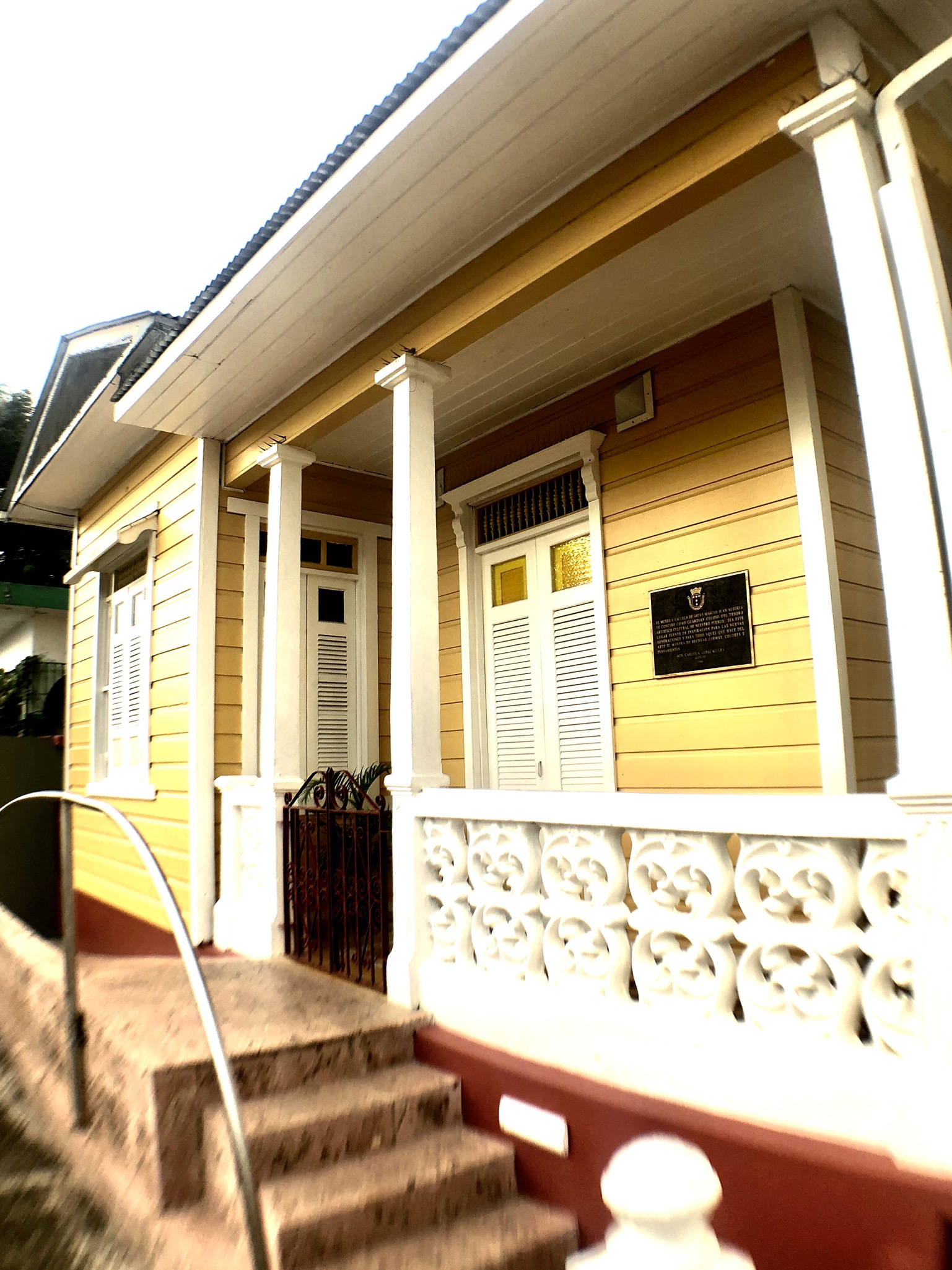
- The house in 2018.

- Location within Puerto Rico
- Location: 196 Norte Street Dorado, Puerto Rico
- Coordinates: 18°27′35″N 66°15′42″W
- Built: 1880
- NRHP reference No.: 89000428
- Added to NRHP: May 22, 1989

The Don Andrés Hernández Residence (Spanish: Residencia Don Andrés Hernández), also known as the Don Modesto Hernández Residence (Residencia Don Modesto Hernández), the Marcos Juan Alegría House (Casa Marcos Juan Alegria) or just the Yellow House (La Casa Amarilla), is a historic house located in Dorado Pueblo (downtown Dorado) in the municipality of the same name in northern Puerto Rico. It was added to the National Register of Historic Places on May 22, 1989. Investigation and oral tradition show that this might very well be the second-oldest house in all of Dorado. The sunken level of property, with regards to the current level of the town, testifies as to the old age of the house. Today it hosts a community art school and museum that showcases visual arts and memorabilia of local artist Marcos Juan Alegría.
