= Casa de los Ponce de León =

Historic house in San Germán, Puerto Rico

- Casa de los Ponce de Leon (Note: The house's name is presented here without the accent on "León" in conformance with the usage in the house's National Register nomination form and announcement of listing.)
- U.S. National Register of Historic Places
- U.S. Historic district – Contributing property
- Location within Puerto Rico
- Location: 13 Dr. Santiago Veve Street; San Germán, Puerto Rico
- Coordinates: 18°04′56″N 67°02′42″W
- Area: 0.1 acres (0.040 ha)
- Architectural style: Colonial
- Part of: San Germán Historic District (ID94000084)
- NRHP reference No.: 83002295
- Added to NRHP: March 9, 1983

The Casa de los Ponce de León is a historic house in San Germán, Puerto Rico. It is possibly the oldest residence in use in Puerto Rico. Its most famous resident was the poet Lola Rodriguez Ponce de León.

The house was listed on the U.S. National Register of Historic Places in 1983.

== See also ==
- National Register of Historic Places listings in western Puerto Rico
- List of the oldest buildings in Puerto Rico
