= San Germán Historic District =

Historic district in Puerto Rico

- U.S. National Register of Historic Places
- U.S. Historic district
- Puerto Rico Historic Sites and Zones
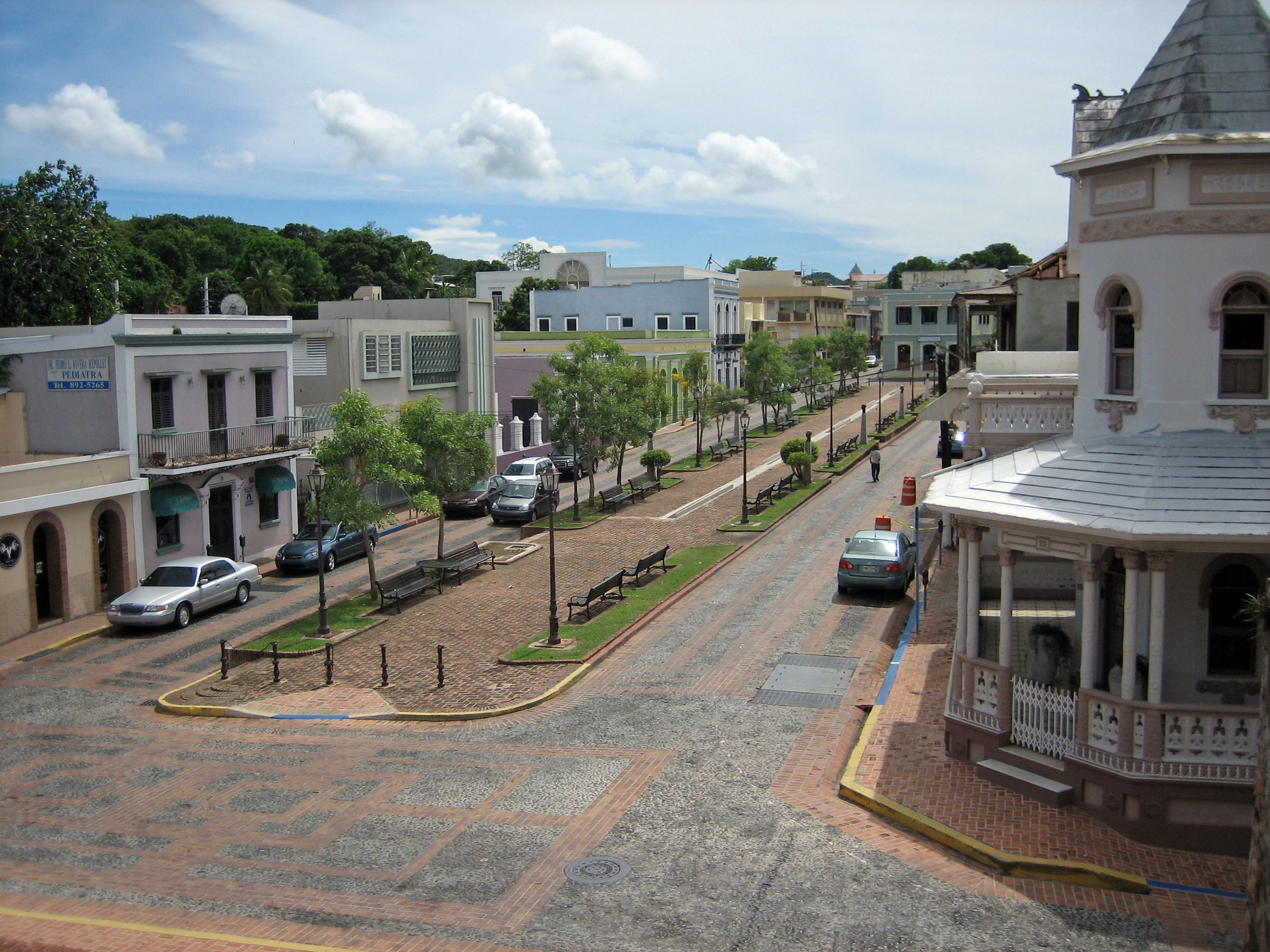
- Plaza Santo Domingo

- Location within Puerto Rico
- Location: San Germán, Puerto Rico
- Coordinates: 18°04′55″N 67°02′38″W
- Area: 36 acres (15 ha)
- Architectural style: Colonial
- NRHP reference No.: 94000084
- RNSZH No.: 93-56-0002-JP-ZH

Significant dates
- Added to NRHP: February 16, 1994
- Designated RNSZH: November 22, 1994

The San Germán Historic District is a 36-acre (15 ha) historic district located in the western section of the town of San Germán, Puerto Rico. The district was added to both the National Register of Historic Places and the Puerto Rico Register of Historic Sites and Zones in 1994. The district contains more than 100 significant buildings, including the Church San Germán de Auxerre and the Convento de Porta Coeli.

== History ==
Spanish colonists established La Villa de San Germán de Auxerre, also known as Nueva Salamanca, in the early years of the 16th century. The town of San Germán grew out of the settlement formally established in 1573, and it is this original urban core, transformed by rapid growth from the 1830s to the 1940s, that comprises the San Germán Historic District.

The district includes numerous homes, among these the noted Victorian-style Juan Ortiz Perichi House on Luna Street, which architect Jorge Rigau once called "one of the best developed spatial sequences in residential architecture in Puerto Rico." Many notable Puerto Ricans came from the San Germán Historic District; among them was Lola Rodríguez de Tió, the well-known poet and pro-independence leader who wrote the lyrics to the revolutionary version of Puerto Rico's national anthem "La Borinqueña".

In late summer 1898, under the command of General Theodore Schwan, the United States Cavalry traveled through Luna Street, during the Spanish-American War, and Puerto Ricans welcomed the Americans in this district and in nearby Mayagüez, with flowers- believing in the promise of prosperity that would come under American rule. Despite wanting to spend the night in San Germán, the Americans decided to continue moving on, to battle the Spanish.

The San Germán Historic District is roughly bounded by Luna, Estrella, Concepción, Javilla, and Ferrocarril Streets in the western section of the town.

== Landmarks and places of interest ==
=== Contributing Properties of the Historic District ===
- Church San Germán Auxerre of San Germán (Spanish: Iglesia San Germán de Auxerre) is the historic Roman Catholic parish church of San Germán. The original church was built in 1688 but was destroyed during several earthquakes throughout the town's history. The current church building dates to 1739 and it has been listed in the National Register of Historic Places since 1984.
- Convent Ruins of Santo Domingo de Porta Coeli (Spanish: Convento de Santo Domingo de Porta Coeli), or simply Porta Coeli, is one of the oldest church buildings in Puerto Rico and the Americas. Originally built in 1609 by the Dominican Order, the building now houses the Porta Coeli Museum of Religious Art. It has been listed in the National Register of Historic Places since 1976.
- Jaime Acosta y Fores Residence (Spanish: Residencia Jaime Acosta y Flores), located on 70 Dr. Santiago Veve Street, is a historic house dating to 1917 and considered a great example of the vernacular Criollo style of Puerto Rican architecture. It has been listed in the National Register of Historic Places since 1990.
- Manzanares Creek Storm Sewer (Spanish: Alcantarilla Pluvial sobre la Quebrada Manzanares), also known as the San Germán underground tunnels, is a historic vaulted brick storm sewer system built in 1835. It has been listed in the National Register of Historic Places since 1990.
- Ponce de León Family House (Spanish: Casa de los Ponce de León) is considered one of the oldest residence buildings in Puerto Rico built by the Ponce de León family. One of its most famous residents was poet and activist Lola Rodríguez de Tió (born Dolores Rodríguez de Astudillo y Ponce de León). It has been listed in the National Register of Historic Places since 1983.

=== Other landmarks and places of interest ===
- Alfredo Ramírez de Arellano y Rosell House (Spanish: Casa Alfredo Ramírez de Arellano y Rosell) is a historic house museum located just outside the historic district. The museum is dedicated to the history of the town.
- The old city hall of San Germán, located in the main town square, now houses the historic town's tourism information office.
- San Germán History Museum (Spanish: Museo de la Historia de San Germán, shortened MHISA) dedicated to the history of San Germán and the surrounding region.
- San Germán Masonic Lodge (Spanish: Logia Masónica de San Germán) is a historic masonic lodge with interesting Neoclassical architecture.
- San Germán Public Square (Spanish: Plaza Pública de San Germán), formerly the Plaza de Armas, is the main town square of San Germán and the site of the Church San Germán Auxerre of San Germán, the former city hall and other historical buildings.
- Santo Domingo Square (Spanish: Plazuela Santo Domingo) is a small historic square located across from Porta Coeli. The square is surrounded by historic houses and often hosts artisan fairs.
- Teatro Sol (Spanish for "sun theater"), located in the main town square, is a historic theater dating to 1914.
- The building of the old train station of San Germán is still preserved.

== Gallery ==
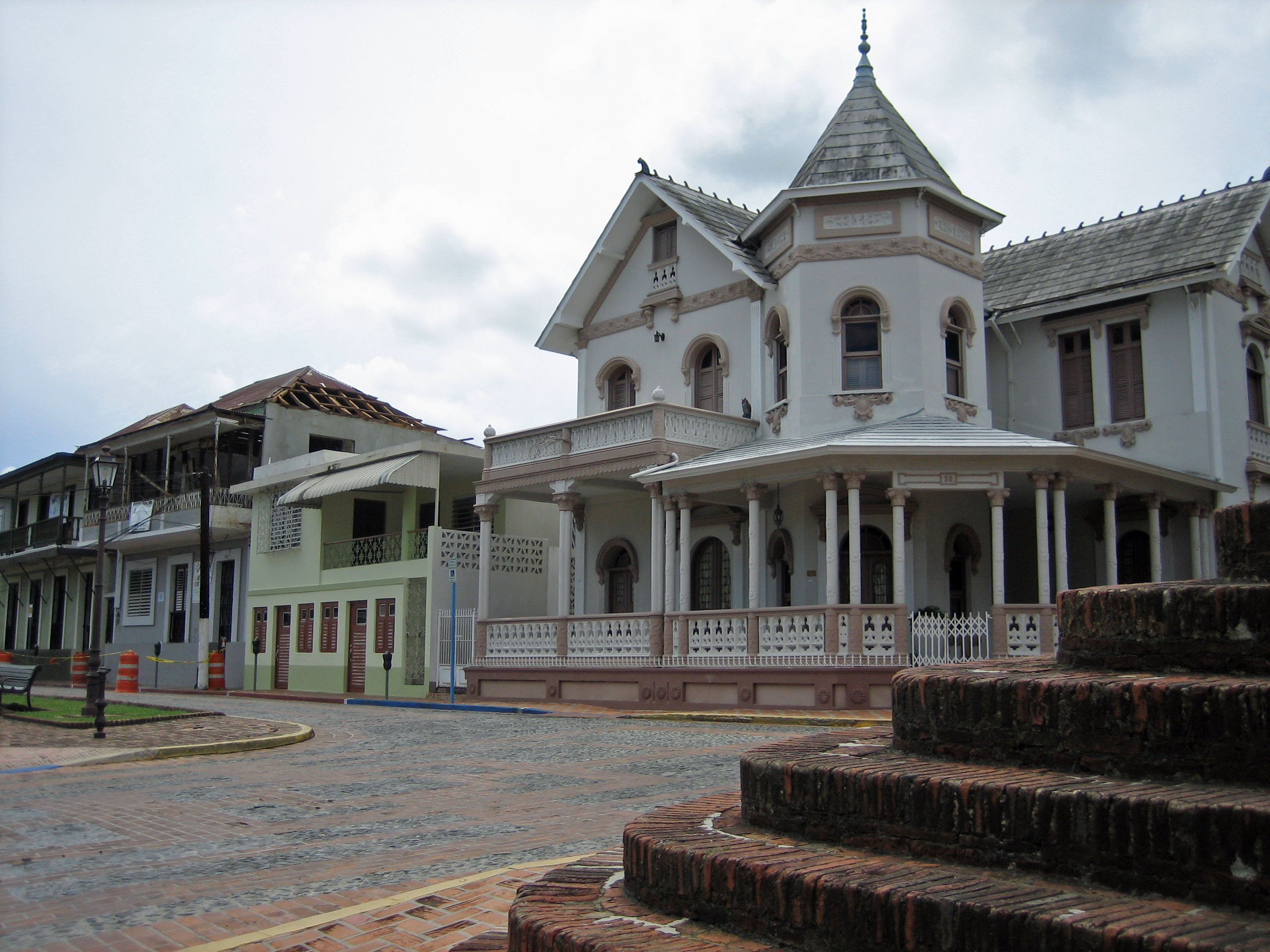
Casa Morales Marco (c.1915)

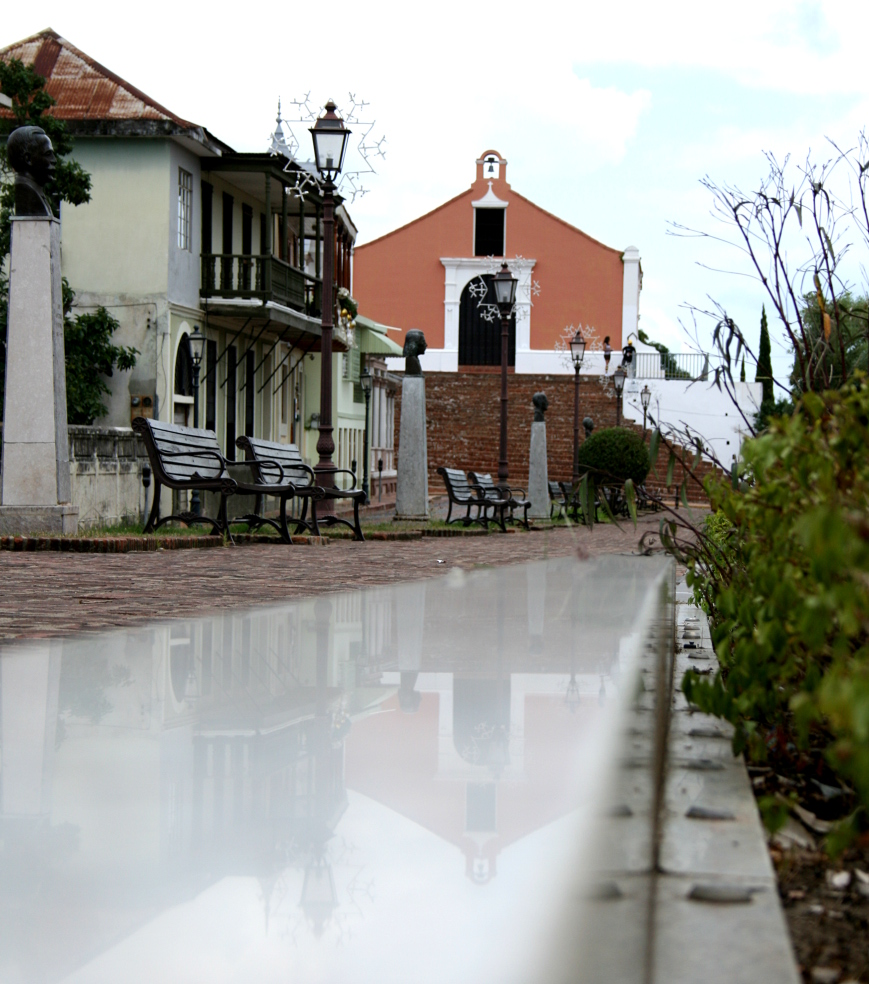
Convento de Porta Coeli (c.1606) overlooks Plaza Francisco Servera Silva

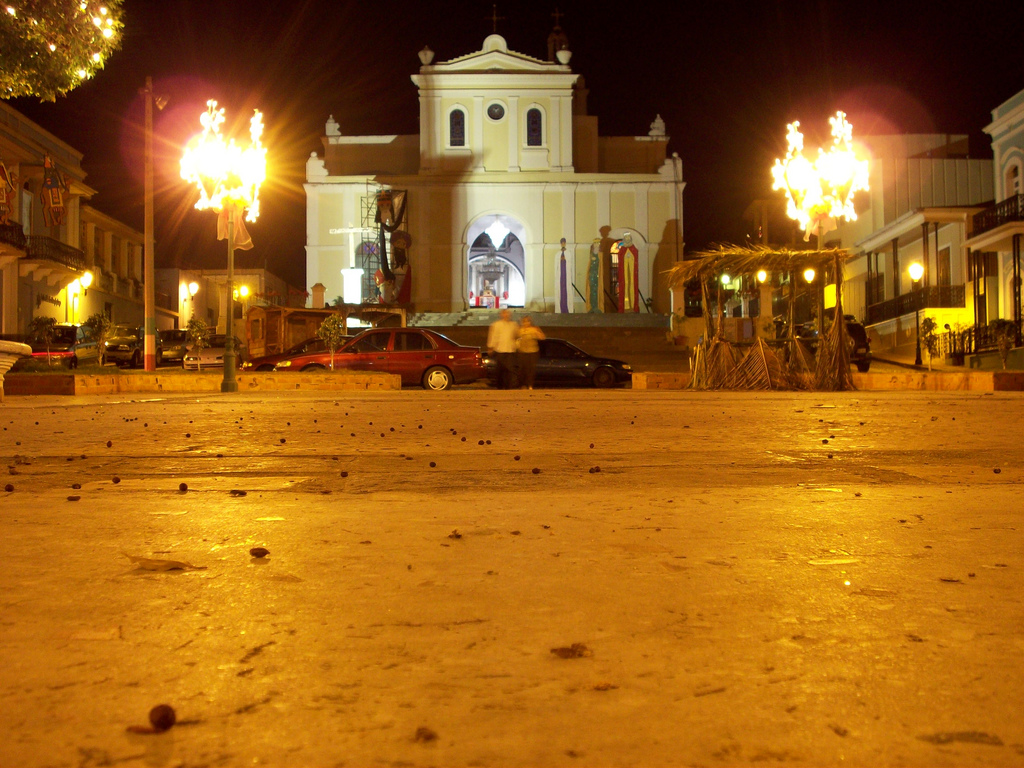
Church San Germán de Auxerre overlooks Plaza Francisco Mariano Quiñones

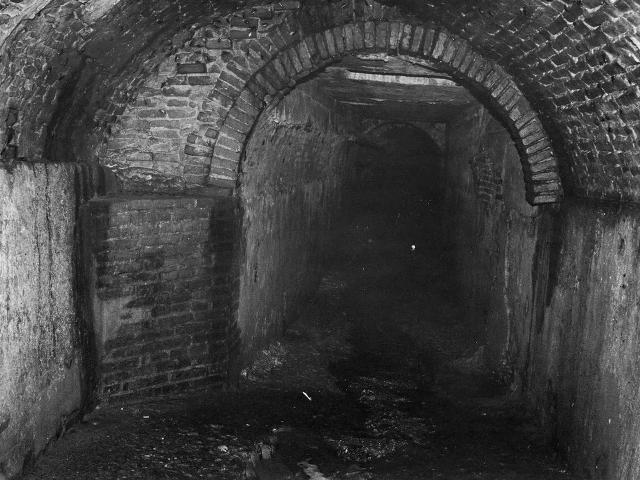
Los Túneles subterráneos de San Germán, vaulted brick storm sewer system built in 1835

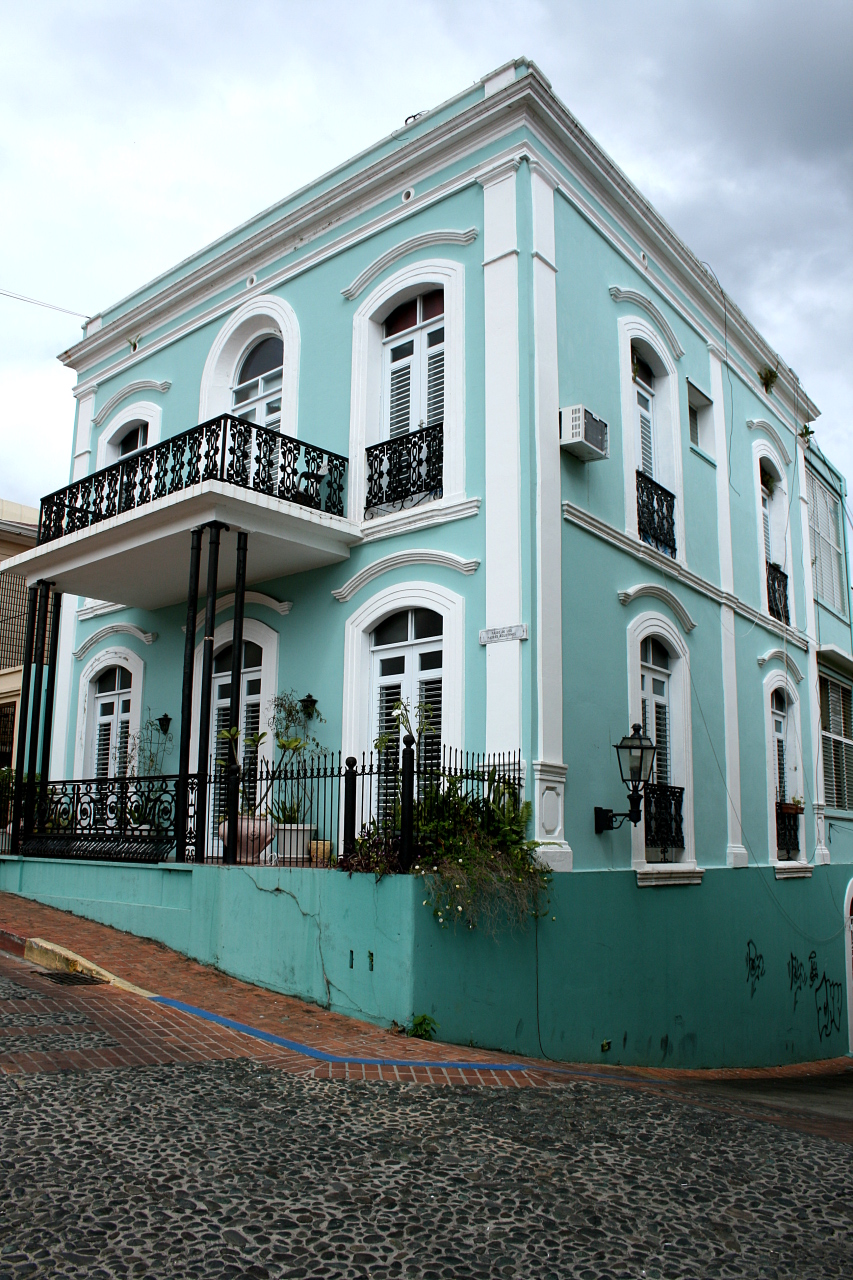
Historic residence in San Germán.

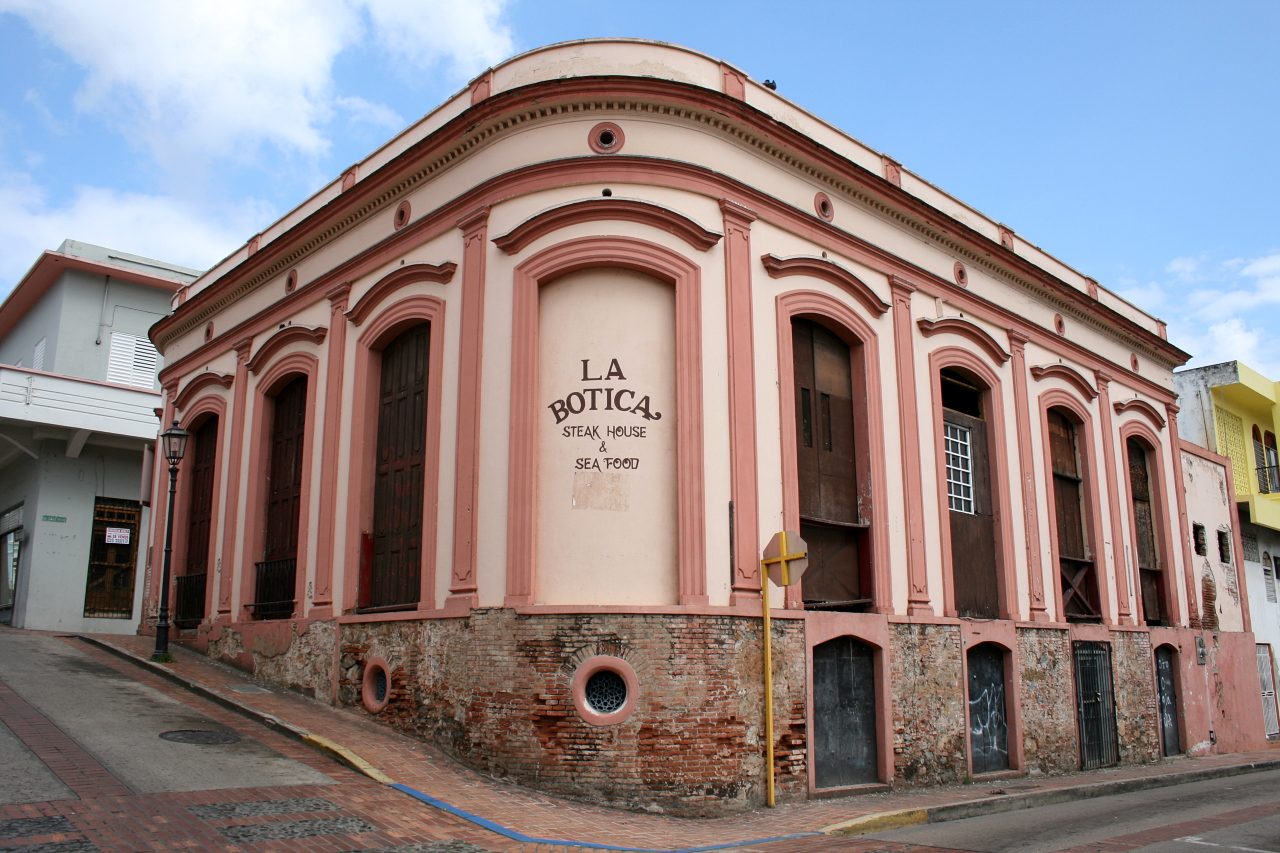
Historic pharmacy in the historic district.
