= Oficina de Telégrafo y Teléfono =

Puerto Rican historic place

- U.S. National Register of Historic Places
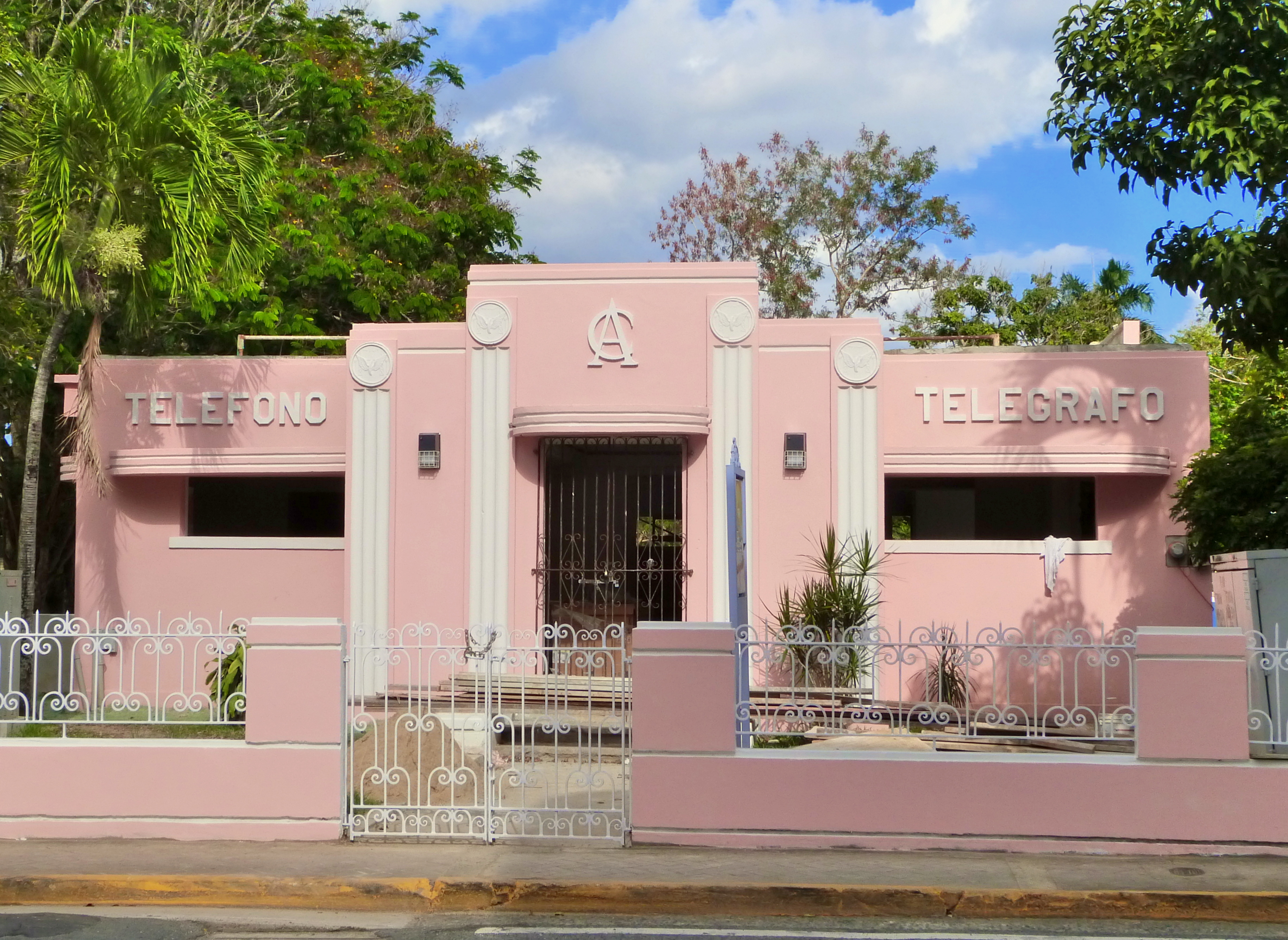
- The building in 2017.

- Location within Puerto Rico
- Location: 1729 José E. Carazo Street Guaynabo, Puerto Rico
- Coordinates: 18°21′32″N 66°6′38″W
- Built: 1948
- Architect: José Hernández Márquez
- Architectural style: Art Deco
- NRHP reference No.: 12000396
- Added to NRHP: July 3, 2012

The Telephone and Telegraph Station of Guaynabo (Spanish: Oficina de Telégrafo y Teléfono de Guaynabo) is a one-story flat roof building located in the downtown (pueblo) area of Guaynabo, Puerto Rico. It was designed in the Art Deco style and constructed entirely of reinforced concrete with glass blocks and ornamental ironwork. It is one of the few (private or public) buildings in the island built entirely in this architectural style. It was added to the United States National Register of Historic Places on July 3, 2012.

The Telegraph and Telephone Station of Guaynabo was constructed in 1948, and since then it has become a significant piece in the history of telecommunications in Guaynabo. It was one of three identical Art Deco buildings of a prototype that combine both the telegraph and telephone services under one roof. This solid, modern and permanent building prototype was designed by the Department of the Interior of Puerto Rico for the installation of the automatic telephone and established in the towns of Juncos, Aibonito and Guaynabo. These buildings gave a new recognizable physical form to both the telephone company and the telegraph station in the island. Constructed between 1943 and 1949, they were also the entities that connected the people of Puerto Rico with the rest of the world. This is one of the two that still remain of those built by the Communications Authority of Puerto Rico’s office facilities, and the only one still existing of the three that was constructed of the Art Deco prototype.

The building today houses the Telegraph Museum, which is administered by the municipal government of Guaynabo. The Telegraph Museum aims to preserve the history of this invention and the history of communications in Puerto Rico.
