= Casa Cautiño =

Historic house museum in Guayama, Puerto Rico

- U.S. National Register of Historic Places
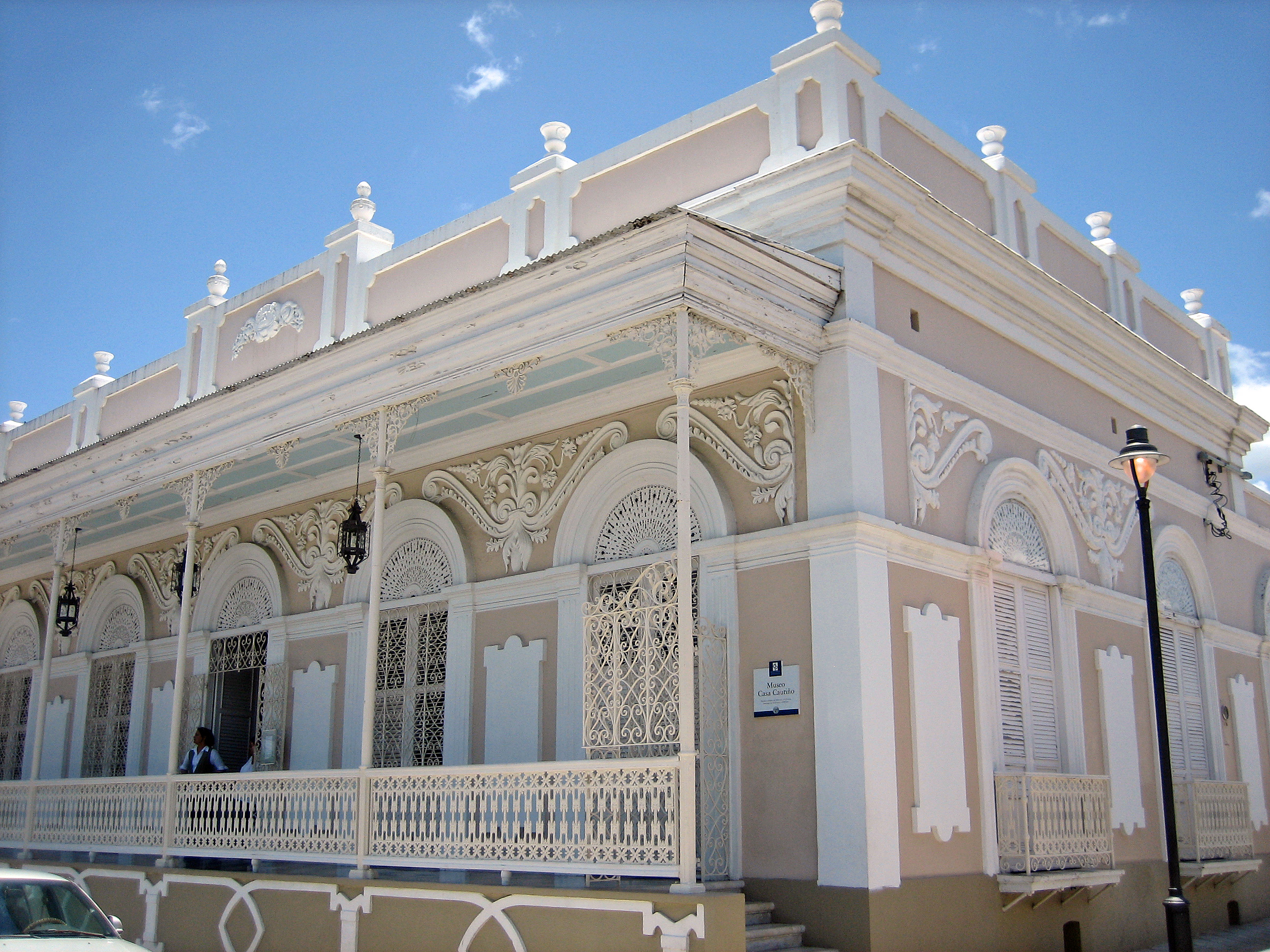
- Casa Cautiño is an example of the local urban architecture from the late nineteenth century

- Location within Puerto Rico
- Location: Calle Santiago Palmer Norte #1; Guayama, Puerto Rico
- Coordinates: 17°59′09″N 66°06′48″W
- Area: 640 m^{2} (6,900 sq ft)
- Built: 1887
- Architectural style: Classical Revival
- NRHP reference No.: 84003137
- Added to NRHP: June 11, 1984

Casa Cautiño is a house museum in Guayama, Puerto Rico, United States. The museum collection, administered by the Institute of Puerto Rican Culture, include works of art, wood carvings, sculptures and furniture built by Puerto Rican cabinetmakers for the Cautiño family. It is listed on the National Register of Historic Places.

== History ==
The house was owned by Genaro Cautiño Vázquez, a wealthy Guayama landowner as well as a colonel of the Volunteer Battalion of the Spanish Army. During the Spanish–American War, the house was the headquarters for the American forces. After the war, Genaro Cautiño returned to occupy the house. An additional Annex house, for extended family, also once existed next to the Iglesia San Antonio. Also, a tunnel still exists linking Casa Cautiño, the annex house and Iglesia San Antonio.

The U-shaped structure is one-story with an interior patio, which local architect Manual Texidor built in 1887 after graduation from the Academy of Fine Arts in Paris.

It features some of the elements of the Neoclassical architecture style, such as cornices, pilasters, candelabra, Roman arches, relief motifs, and classical ornamentation. These elements were blended with some of the details of the popular architecture of the southern area of Puerto Rico that prevailed when the structure was built.

== See also ==
- National Register of Historic Places listings in Guayama, Puerto Rico
- List of museums in Puerto Rico
