= Iglesia San Blas de Illescas =

Historic church in Puerto Rico

- Church San Blas de Illescas of Coamo
- U.S. National Register of Historic Places
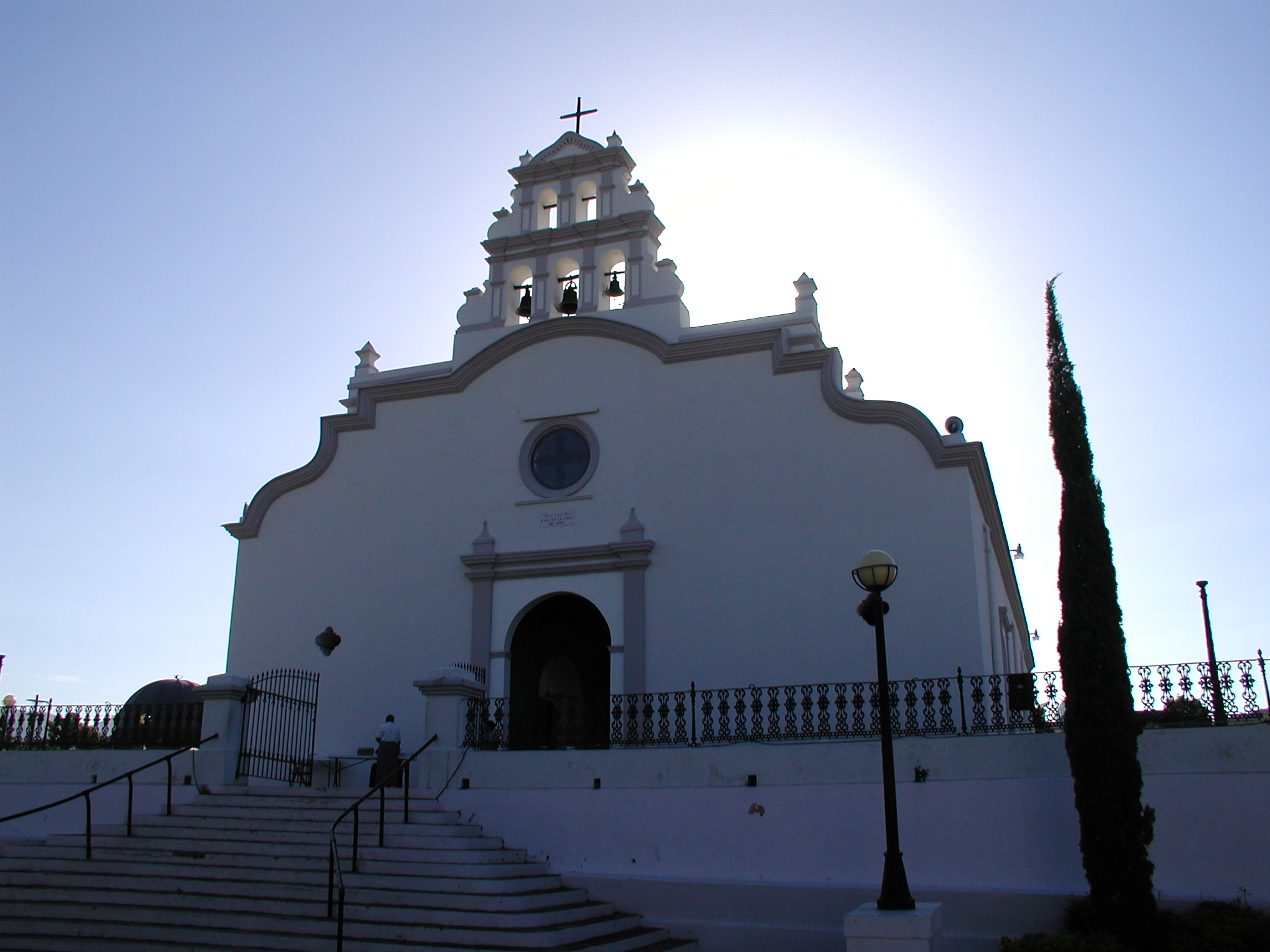

- Location within Puerto Rico
- Location: Mario Braschi Street, Town Plaza; Coamo, Puerto Rico
- Coordinates: 18°04′51″N 66°21′22″W
- Area: 0.5 acres (0.20 ha)
- Built: 1661
- Architectural style: Spanish Colonial-Latin American Baroque Revival
- MPS: Historic Churches of Puerto Rico TR
- NRHP reference No.: 84000463
- Added to NRHP: December 10, 1984

The Iglesia San Blas de Illescas (English: Church of Saint Blaise of Illescas) is a Catholic parish church located on the center plaza of Coamo, Puerto Rico. Construction on the church began in 1661; it has since been judged "one of the most important works of religious architecture in Puerto Rico".

The church is separated from the open plaza below by a series of ceremonial steps and a delicate cast iron balustrade. The delicately curved Baroque facade reflects a major reconstruction completed in 1784. A two-level bell-gable with open arches and bells is prominently featured in the facade. The parish of San Blas of Coamo is one of the oldest on the island.

== See also ==
- List of the oldest buildings in Puerto Rico
