= Porta Coeli (Puerto Rico) =

Museum and former church in San Germán, Puerto Rico

- Convento de Porta Coeli
- U.S. National Register of Historic Places
- U.S. Historic district – Contributing property
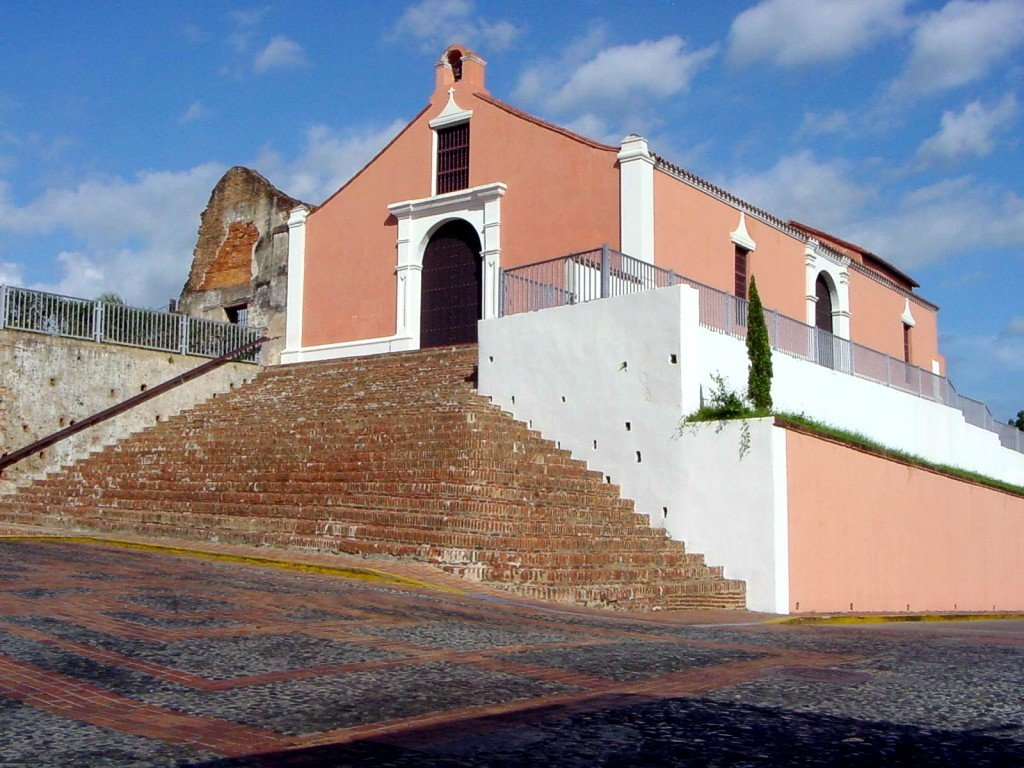
- Porta Coeli Church - San Germán, Puerto Rico

- Location within Puerto Rico
- Location: Plaza Porta Coeli, San Germán, Puerto Rico
- Coordinates: 18°04′55″N 67°02′28″W
- Built: 1609
- Part of: San Germán Historic District (ID94000084)
- NRHP reference No.: 76002252
- Added to NRHP: September 8, 1976

Porta Coeli, "Latin for "Heaven Gate", is the name given today to the former Church and Convent of Santo Domingo de Porta Coeli (Spanish: Iglesia y Convento de Santo Domingo de Porta Coeli), particularly to its remaining church building, which today is the sole surviving structure of the convent and host of the Religious Art Museum of Porta Coeli.

Since the name comes from Latin, it is pronounced correctly as "Porta Cheh-lee", the chapel is located in the historic district of San Germán, Puerto Rico, this structure is one of the oldest surviving church structures in both Puerto Rico and the Western Hemisphere.

== History ==
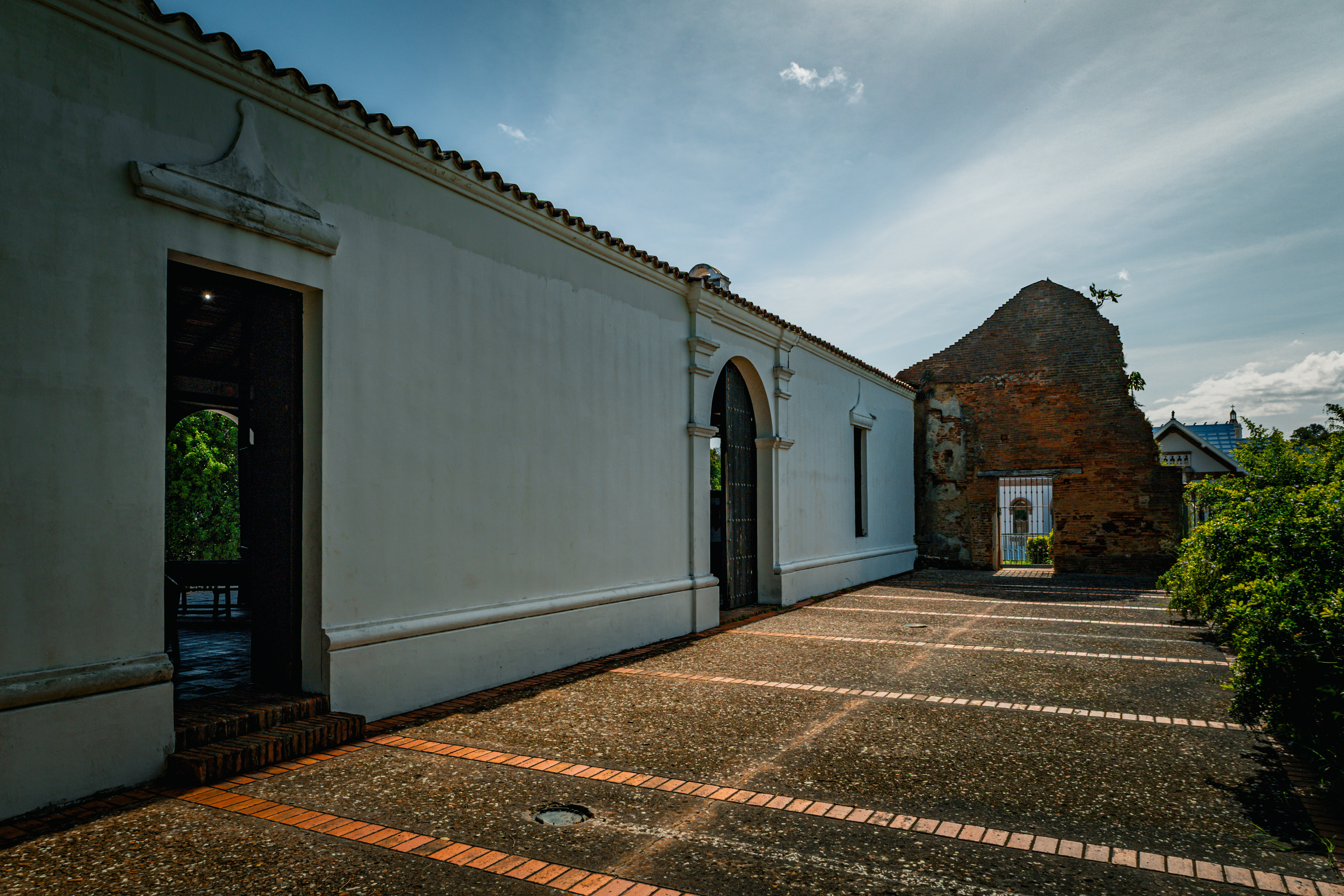
Convent of Santo Domingo ruins

In 1609, the Dominican Order built the Convent of Porta Coeli at the crest of a hill in what is now San Germán Pueblo. The famous church building, first established as a chapel overlooking a small town square (Plaza de Santo Domingo), dates to 1692.

After particularly destructive earthquakes in 1717 and 1737, the convent was reconstructed and a new church built next to it during the 18th century. The single nave church was constructed of rubble masonry with stucco surfaced walls and a wood truss roof.

In 1949 Ubaldino Ramírez de Arellano, Monsignor MacManus, Bishop of Ponce, Senator Santiago R. Palmer and others arranged for the church of Porta Coeli to be sold to the Government of Puerto Rico for a dollar so that it would be responsible for its safekeeping and preservation. The church structure, although no longer a functioning religious site, has since become an icon of the Roman Catholic religion of Puerto Rico and a landmark of San Germán.

The building was listed in 1976 on the U.S. National Register of Historic Places as "Convento de Porta Coeli", and further listed in the National Register as a contributing property of the San Germán Historic District, listed on February 16, 1994, and on the Puerto Rico Register of Historic Sites and Zones on November 22, 1994.

The church and former convent celebrated its 410 anniversary in 2015 with events and both religious and cultural activities established by the local parish, the Dominican Order and by several agencies of the Puerto Rican government to conmemorate the institution and its role in the history of the town and Puerto Rico.

== Religious Art Museum ==
After restoration by the Institute of Puerto Rican Culture, the church now houses the Religious Art Museum of Porta Coeli (Museo de Arte Religioso). The first of its type in the island, this museum was established by Ricardo Alegría in 1960. This is a museum of religious paintings and wooden carvings dating from the 18th and 19th centuries. Of particular interest are the Baroque-style altarpieces, a Black Virgin of Montserrat statuette, and religious figures of Puerto Rican and Mexican origin.

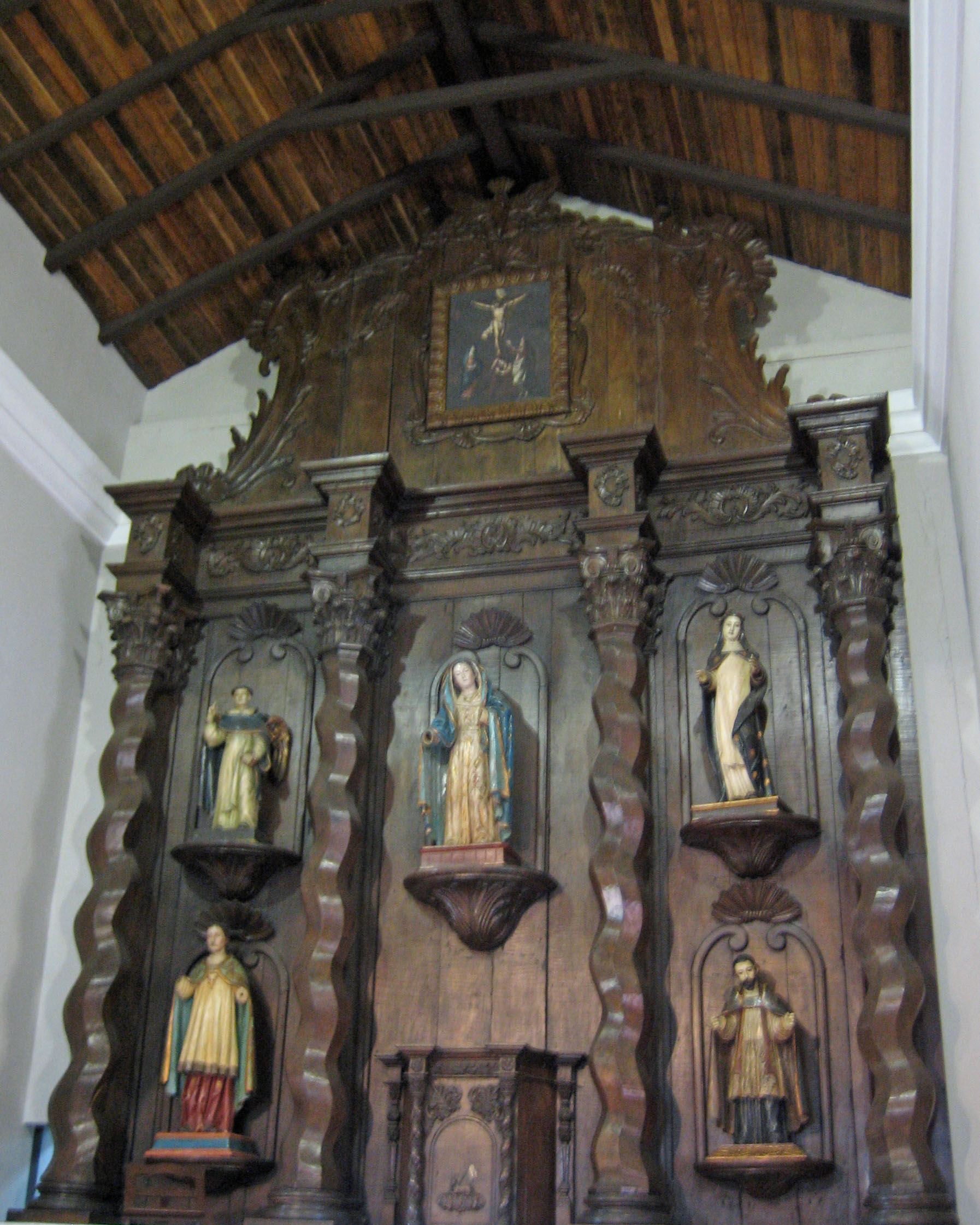
Altarpiece of Porta Coeli

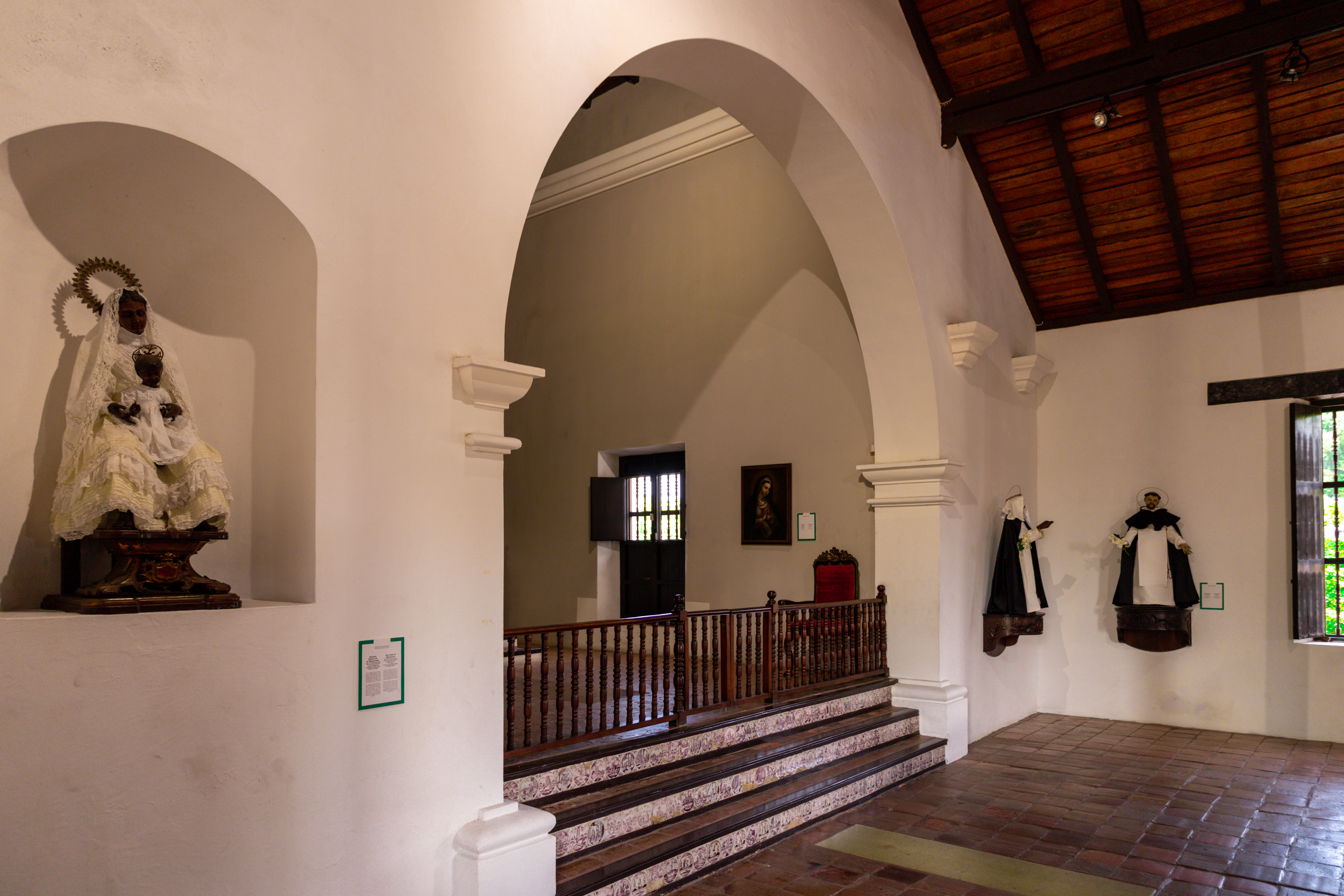
Wooden saints

== Popular culture ==
There is also a Porta Coeli cemetery in Puerto Rico. Located in Bayamón, it is the resting grounds, among others, of Luis Aguad Jorge, a Cuban actor who became famous in Puerto Rico as the enanito de Holsum, or Holsum (bread)'s dwarf.
