= List of the oldest courthouses in the United States =

Below is a list of the oldest extant courthouses in the United States.

== Active ==
Courthouse	Photo	Location	Built	Notes
King William County Courthouse		Virginia	1725	Built in 1725, this is the oldest courthouse still in continuous use in the United States. It is also the oldest public building still in use in Virginia. The courthouse is constructed of brick laid in Flemish bond. In 1840 the courthouse was enlarged and a brick wall was erected to enclose the court green and to keep livestock and poultry away from the buildings. A new and modern county courthouse was built upon the courthouse grounds in 2004; however, the 1725 courthouse remains in use for some of the county's judicial functions and proceedings.
Old Salem County Courthouse		New Jersey	1735	Built in 1735, this building is the oldest active courthouse in New Jersey and is the second oldest courthouse still in continuous use in the United States. It was built using locally manufactured bricks and was enlarged in 1817 and 1908. It served as the courthouse for Salem County until 1969 when a larger and more modern facility was built for the county. Today it serves as the courthouse for the Salem City Municipal Court. In 1774, the courthouse was the site of a county petition to King George III to address various colonial grievances and for authorizing county relief to the citizens of Boston to assist them from the King's sanctions from the Boston Tea Party incident. Judge William Hancock of the King's Court of Common Pleas presided at the courthouse. He was later unintentionally killed by British soldiers in the American Revolution during the massacre of Hancock House (New Jersey) committed by the British against local Revolutionary militia during the Salem Raid in 1778. The courthouse was afterwards the scene of the "treason trials" of 1778, wherein suspected Loyalists were put on trial for having allegedly aided the British during the Salem Raid. Four men were convicted and sentenced to death for treason; however, they were pardoned by Governor William Livingston and exiled from New Jersey. The courthouse is also the site of the legend of Colonel Robert Gibbon Johnson proving the edibility of the tomato. Before 1820, Americans often assumed tomatoes were poisonous. In 1820, Colonel Johnson, according to legend, stood upon the courthouse steps and ate tomatoes in front of a large amazed crowd assembled to watch him do so.
Hanover County Courthouse		Virginia	1737–1742	This courthouse is often cited as having been built in 1735, although it is dated by the state register as having been built between 1737 and 1742. It is the third oldest courthouse still in use in the United States. This courthouse was the local county seat of lawyer and patriot Patrick Henry. It was in this courthouse that Patrick Henry argued the case of the Parson's Cause in 1763. A case involving King George III's requirement that Virginia residents pay taxes to support the local Anglican Church ministry over the objection of Virginia residents and the Virginia colonial legislature, Henry accused the King of tyranny in overturning colonial law without regard to the wishes of his subjects. The case and Henry's arguments are now regarded by many historians as one of the prelude events leading to the American Revolution. In 1774, the courthouse was the site of local preparation for the first assembly of the Virginia Convention and it considered grievances against British rule and the "Hanover Resolves" adopted at the meeting also supported the Boston Tea Party.
Charles City County Courthouse		Virginia	1730s–1750s	This courthouse actually may be the second oldest courthouse but its actual construction date is no longer known. Some estimates believe it was built as early as 1730 or the early 1730s but others date it more towards the mid-1750s. Men like Benjamin Harrison V, a signer of the Declaration of Independence, and John Tyler, the 10th President of the United States, argued here. The courthouse was the scene of considerable fighting during the Civil War and many of its colonial records were lost, including the date of construction.
Richmond County Courthouse		Virginia	1748	Built in 1748, this courthouse, a fine example of early classical Palladian style architecture, remains the county courthouse to this date. Richmond County, Virginia in the Northern Neck of Virginia is not to be confused with Richmond, Virginia.
King and Queen County Courthouse		Virginia	ca. 1750	The original portion of this structure was built around 1750. It has been rebuilt and remodelled extensively due to fires, including those set by Union forces in retaliation for a murder of a Union general by local Home Guard militia during the Civil War, and also expanded to accommodate growth in local population. A new facility was constructed in 1997 to handle the majority of the county judicial proceedings but the old courthouse remains active for handling court proceedings.
Charleston County Courthouse		South Carolina	1753	Built in 1753, it served as the provincial capitol for the colony of South Carolina with colonial court proceedings being held on the first floor. It was gutted by fire during the Constitutional Ratification Convention of 1788, leaving only the foundation, walls and doorways. It was rebuilt within the remaining structure in 1792 and, with additions and a recent restoration towards its colonial past, has served as the county courthouse to this time. Among the trials held here were those of captured soldiers of the 54th Massachusetts Volunteer Infantry, the famed black regiment of the Union Army in the Civil War, who were tried and acquitted of slave insurrection in November 1863 following the Union assault of Fort Wagner.
Sussex County Courthouse		New Jersey	1765	Built in 1765, the courthouse was the site of a daring raid during the American Revolution by one of the Loyalists' best operatives, Lieutenant James Moody. In 1780, Moody led several men to free eight Loyalist prisoners held in the Sussex County Courthouse. Moody freed the men and fled with them. Despite a pursuit lasting several days, Revolutionary forces failed to capture them. The court was gutted by fire in 1847 and rebuilt within the original fieldstone walls. It continues to handle judicial proceedings in conjunction with a newer facility.
Chowan County Courthouse		North Carolina	1767	Built in 1767, it served as a local Whig center during the Revolutionary War. It is the oldest public building in North Carolina and one of the best preserved and majestic colonial courthouses of Georgian architecture in the nation. It served as a banquet hall when President James Monroe visited Edenton in 1819. Currently is serves for conducting county judicial proceedings in conjunction with a newer facility and also for handling other local government activities.
Fulton County Courthouse		New York	1772	Built in 1772 in Johnstown, it was requested and partially funded by Sir William Johnson and the first judges presiding at the courthouse included his son Sir John Johnson and John Butler, both of whom later operated Loyalist brigades during the American Revolution such as the King's Royal Regiment of New York and Butler's Rangers. The building is the oldest courthouse in New York and it still regularly functions as the county courthouse to this day. At the time it was built, Johnstown was in Montgomery County. The courthouse name was changed when Fulton County was created in 1838. Notable individuals that have appeared before the court include James Kent, Alexander Hamilton, Thomas Addis Emmet, Abraham Van Vechten, Ebenezer Foote and Judge Daniel Cady, the father of Elizabeth Cady Stanton.
New London County Courthouse		Connecticut	1784	Built in 1784, it is the oldest courthouse in Connecticut. American Patriot Patrick Henry argued cases in the courthouse and other historical notables such as Daniel Webster, Gilbert du Motier, marquis de La Fayette and Horace Greeley spoke here.
Queen Anne's County Courthouse		Maryland	1791	Built in 1791, it is the oldest active courthouse in Maryland. The earlier county court, built in 1708, still stands and is a museum.
Shenandoah County Courthouse		Virginia	1795	Built in 1795, this building continues to operate as the county courthouse to this day.
Burlington County Courthouse		New Jersey	1796	Built in 1796, its architect, Samuel Lewis, designed the building as a virtual identical twin of Congress Hall and Old City Hall, the buildings flanking Independence Hall in Philadelphia, which he also built. The courthouse bell, removed and installed from an earlier courthouse, rang for independence in 1776. The courthouse continues to handle judicial proceedings.

== Former courthouses ==
The following other old courthouses still standing today exist as museums, for other government functions, or are now privately owned facilities.

Courthouse	Photo	Location	Built	Notes
Former Queen Anne County Courthouse		Maryland	1708	Built in 1708, it is likely the oldest courthouse still standing in the United States. Today the property is open as a museum.
Old Chester Courthouse		Pennsylvania	1724	This is the oldest public building in continuous use in the United States. It is a handsome structure and a well preserved and valuable example of a colonial period stone courthouse. From 1724 until 1786, it served as the courthouse for Chester County, Pennsylvania and, after a county division, the courthouse for Delaware County, Pennsylvania until the county seat was relocated in 1851. Thereafter is served as the town hall for the City of Chester, Pennsylvania until the 1960s. Today it is used for miscellaneous city, county and civic functions. Colonists assembled here for the Havana raid during the War of Jenkins' Ear. The courthouse was a scene of the reading of the Declaration of Independence following its announcement in Philadelphia and the court's bell, which is still in its cupola, rang to announce independence. Several prominent legal and political figures argued at the court, including Thomas McKean, signer of the American Declaration of Independence. Gilbert du Motier, marquis de La Fayette was hosted and honored here. It was the site of the tragedy story of the trial and hanging of Elizabeth (Harriot) Wilson and the resulting story of the Pennsylvania Hermit, William (Amos) Wilson.
Old Essex County Courthouse		Virginia	1729	Converted and expanded into a church in the 19th century.
New Castle County Court House		Delaware	1730	This building was built over the remains of Delaware's first courthouse (1689) that was burnt by an arsonist and of which the foundation is still visible. It served as the county courthouse until 1881 when the county seat was moved to Wilmington, Delaware. The building is the center of the twelve mile circle that forms part of the boundary between Delaware and Pennsylvania. It was originally the colonial and state capitol in addition to a courthouse, and it was here that the Assembly voted to separate from England and drafted the first Delaware Constitution. It is now part of the First State National Historical Park.
Old Northampton County Courthouse		Virginia	1731	The first judges held court on the lower Eastern Shore of Virginia starting in 1632 by meeting in private homes, ordinaries and taverns. In 1677 the court was moved to an area called "The Hornes", later to be called Peachburg Town, and then Eastville. The site has served as the seat of Northampton County government since that time. Circa 1731, the old Northampton County Courthouse, laid in Flemish bond brickwork, was preceded by at least two wooden structures. The 1731 courthouse became too small and use was discontinued in 1795. It was leased as a store with the condition that the structure be re-roofed and maintained. In 1913 the County bought back the lease and prepared to demolish the structure. A campaign by local residents to save the structure began and the building was moved 30 feet to its current location and preserved for visitors today. The site also holds the old Clerk's Office (c. 1725 – 1750), old Debtor's Prison (ca. 1814), a former courthouse (1899), a former jail (1914), and Lawyer's Row. One of the most complete historic court greens in the United States the Eastville Court Green is listed as a Historic District on both the Virginia Landmarks Register and the National Register of Historic Places. A museum curated by the Northampton Historic Preservation Society is housed in the former 1899 courthouse.
Cahokia Courthouse		Illinois	ca. 1740	This structure was erected as a private residence circa 1740 when the area was French territory. In 1793, the residence was purchased by the federal government to function as the court for the United States Northwest Territory. It also hosted territorial government activities. It is Illinois's oldest courthouse and the only surviving territorial court. The courthouse is architecturally significant as an example of the French Colonial vertical log poteaux-sur-solle ("post-on-sill") construction technique.
Old Middlesex County Courthouse		Virginia	1745	Located in Urbanna, Virginia. Now serves as the Middlesex County Woman's Club
Plymouth Courthouse		Massachusetts	1749	Built of wood, it served as a courthouse until 1820. It also served local municipal uses from 1749 until the 1950s. It was opened as a museum in 1970.
Old Isle of Wight Courthouse		Virginia	1750s	Located in Smithfield, Virginia.
Pownalborough Courthouse		Maine	1761	Judges and lawyers who served or appeared here include Robert Treat Paine, Benedict Arnold, William Cushing, and James Sullivan. Today it is a museum.
Old Gloucester County Courthouse		Virginia	1766	
Perth Amboy City Hall		New Jersey	1767	This building is now the oldest City Hall in continuous use in the United States. It originally held court functions as well as city administration functions.
Williamsburg-James City County Courthouse		Virginia	1771	
Olde Colonial Courthouse, Barnstable		Massachusetts	c.1763	Wooden structure, construction initiated in 1763. About 1,500 citizens assembled here in 1774 to protest the British Intolerable Acts, which revoked the colony's rights of self-government. Their actions effectively ended British control of Cape Cod. Replaced as county courthouse in 1834 and converted to a church in 1842. Now maintained by Tales of Cape Cod.
Old Grafton County Courthouse		New Hampshire	1774	Built in 1774, this building was the site of Daniel Webster's first criminal case in 1805 and served as a courthouse until 1823. It thereafter served as a public library for many years and is now maintained as a museum.
Old West Liberty Courthouse		West Virginia	1778–79	Demolished in 2020.
Bedford Courthouse		New York	1787	Today this is open as a museum.
Hardy County Courthouse		West Virginia	1792	Built in 1792, it served as a courthouse until 1860 and is now a luxury apartment building.
Hunterdon County Courthouse		New Jersey	1793	Struck by fire likely caused by arson in 1828, it was heavily rebuilt using and incorporating the original walls. The courthouse was the scene of the trial of Bruno Hauptmann, the man convicted in the Lindbergh kidnapping case in what became coined as "The Crime of the Century" and "The Trial of the Century" in popular media and folklore at the time. Today it is open for tours including regular re-enactments of the Hauptmann trial and for ceremonial purposes.
Old Carteret County Courthouse		North Carolina	1796	This is the oldest surviving wooden courthouse in North Carolina. Today it serves as a museum and hosts an interactive dramatization program that allows school children to conduct mock trials and reenactments for famous trials for educational purposes.
Old Greene County Courthouse		Pennsylvania	1796	This structure, now a museum, shows a good example of an early wooden log cabin courthouse.
Old Fairfax County Courthouse		Virginia	1799	
Old Russell County Courthouse		Virginia	1799	
The Cabildo		Louisiana	1799	The Cabildo in New Orleans was built between 1795 and 1799 as the home of the Spanish municipal government after the original Cabildo was destroyed in the Great New Orleans Fire. The building took its name from the colonial governing body, the "Illustrious Cabildo," or city council. The Cabildo was the site of the Louisiana Purchase transfer ceremonies in 1803, and continued to be used by the New Orleans city council until the mid-1850s. The building's main hall, the Sala Capitular ("Capitol Room"), was originally utilized as a courtroom. The Spanish used the courtroom from 1799 to 1803, and from 1803 to 1812, it was used by the Louisiana territorial superior court. After the American Civil War, it was the home of the Louisiana Supreme Court from 1868 to 1910. The Sala Capitular was the site of several landmark court cases, including Plessy v. Ferguson. In 1911 the Cabildo became the home of the Louisiana State Museum.
Old Lincoln County Courthouse		New Mexico	1873	

== By state ==
=== Active ===
State	Courthouse	Photo	Built	Notes
Alabama	Talladega County Courthouse		1836	This building, although severely damaged by a tornado on May 11, 1912 and gutted by a fire on March 13, 1925, is the oldest courthouse in continuous use in Alabama. It was significantly altered from its original form when rebuilt after the fire. It is a contributing building to the Talladega Courthouse Square Historic District, added to the National Register of Historic Places on October 18, 1972. The next oldest courthouse in continuous use, architecturally unaltered, is the St. Clair County Courthouse in Ashville, completed in 1844.
Alaska	Homer Courthouse			A new facility is being planned for 2009.
Arizona	Pinal County Courthouse		1891	
Arkansas	Crawford County Courthouse		1842	The Crawford County Courthouse, originally built in 1842, is the oldest operating courthouse west of the Mississippi River. Following a fire in 1876, the courthouse was rebuilt using the original walls that survived the blaze. Doric columns, a three-story clock tower with bell, cast roof rises and a classic portico constitute the building's facade. Wings flank the building to the southeast and northwest.
California	Mariposa County Courthouse		1854	Built in 1854, this fine early Greek Revival building is the oldest courthouse in continuous use west of the Rockies.
Colorado	Hinsdale County Courthouse		1877	
Connecticut	New London County Courthouse		1784	
Delaware	Sussex County Courthouse		1839	
Florida	Osceola County Courthouse		1890	
Georgia	Columbia County Courthouse		1825	Built in 1824–25, it was declared the state's oldest and still active courthouse after a county rivalry with Fayette County for the distinctions.
Hawaii				
Idaho				
Illinois	Putnam County Courthouse		1839	
Indiana	Ohio County Courthouse		1844	
Iowa	Van Buren County Courthouse		1843	It was built in 1843 and is Iowa's oldest courthouse in continuous operation and the oldest in continuous use west of the Mississippi.
Kansas	Chase County Courthouse		1873	It was built in 1873 with native Cottonwood Limestone and is the oldest operating courthouse in Kansas.
Kentucky	Washington County Courthouse		1816	
Louisiana	East Feliciana Parish Courthouse		1840	
Maine	Lincoln County Courthouse		1824	Built in 1824 to replace the Old Lincoln County Courthouse, it is the oldest courthouse still in use in the state.
Maryland	Queen Anne's County Courthouse		1791	
Massachusetts	Newburyport Superior Courthouse		1805	The Newburyport Superior Courthouse was built in 1800, designed by Charles Bulfinch.
Michigan	Berrien County 1839 Courthouse		1839	On May 23, 1974, and June 17, 1974, Senate Concurrent Resolution No. 367, of the Michigan State Senate and House of Representatives, identified the Berrien County 1839 Courthouse in Berrien Springs, Michigan, as the oldest courthouse in Michigan. The Berrien County Clerk's office retains a record of all of the historic records of this historic courthouse. The United States Department of the Interior placed it on the National Register of Historic Places in 1970 and the State of Michigan designated it as "Michigan Historic Building Number 50" in 1968. It is still identified as an active courthouse as defined by Michigan Legislature MCL600.1515 of Act 236 of 1961, and is used for the purposes outlined in the Act.
Minnesota	Dodge County Courthouse		1871	
Mississippi	Amite County Courthouse		1840	
Missouri	Lafayette County Courthouse		1847	
Montana	Madison County Courthouse		1876	
Nebraska	Otoe County Courthouse		1865	The brick Italianate courthouse, the oldest public building in the state, was completed in 1865, two years before Nebraska became a state.
Nevada	Storey County Courthouse		1877	
New Hampshire				
New Jersey	Old Salem County Courthouse		1735	Built in 1735, this building is the oldest active courthouse in New Jersey and is the second oldest courthouse still in continuous use in the United States.
New Mexico	Union County Courthouse		1909	
New York	Fulton County Courthouse		1772	
North Carolina	Chowan County Courthouse		1767	Built in 1767, it is the oldest public building in North Carolina and one of the best preserved and majestic colonial courthouses of Georgian architecture in the nation.
North Dakota				
Ohio	Perry County Courthouse		1829	Built in 1829, this is a former county courthouse that is still in used today as a town court.
Oklahoma	Kiowa County Courthouse		1902	
Oregon	Benton County Courthouse		1889	
Pennsylvania	Lehigh County Courthouse		1817	Built in 1817, this courthouse is the oldest active courthouse but it was altered in 1841 to show a new style.
Rhode Island	Kent County Courthouse		1803	Currently, serves as a town hall and meeting place for the probate court
South Carolina	Charleston County Courthouse		1753	
South Dakota	Huchinson County Courthouse		1881	
Tennessee	Dickson County Courthouse		1836	Built in 1833, following the Tornado of 1830 that destroyed all but one building on the now Historic Court Square.
Texas	Cass County Courthouse		1861	
Utah	Brigham City Courthouse		1857	The original adobe structure, built in 1857, still forms the core of the present courthouse, making it the oldest extant and active courthouse in Utah.
Vermont	Windham County Courthouse		1825	
Virginia	King William County Courthouse		1725	Built in 1725, this is the oldest courthouse still in continuous use in the United States. It is also the oldest public building still in use in Virginia.
Washington	Columbia County Courthouse		1887	
West Virginia	Jefferson County Courthouse		1808	
Wisconsin	Iowa County Courthouse		1859	
Wyoming	Uinta County Courthouse		1873	Built in 1873, it was drastically modified in 1904 but is nevertheless the state's oldest courthouse.

=== 1808Former ===
State	Courthouse	Photo	Built	Notes
Alabama	Old Morgan County Courthouse		1837	This Late Federal style building is the oldest extant courthouse in Alabama. It was added to the National Register of Historic Places on March 24, 1972.
Delaware	New Castle County Courthouse		1731	See earlier section above for more details.
Florida	Old Manatee County Courthouse		1860	Built in 1859–1860, it is the oldest surviving courthouse and is now part of the Manatee Village Historical Park.
Hawaii	Old Lahaina Courthouse		1859	A bad storm in 1858 destroyed more than 20 houses in Lahaina, including Hale Piula (the courthouse) that was built in the 1830s as a palace for King Kamehameha III but was never completed. A year later a new courthouse was built using stones from the old one and for a year it served as the center of justice for Maui County.
Idaho	Pierce Courthouse		1862	Built in 1862, the structure was used until 1884. It was later sold for a mere $50.
Illinois	Cahokia Courthouse		1740s	
Kentucky	Old Green County Courthouse		1803	Built of stone in 1803, it is the oldest stone courthouse west of the Allegheny Mountains.
Louisiana	The Cabildo		1799	The Cabildo in New Orleans was built between 1795 and 1799 as the home of the Spanish municipal government after the original Cabildo was destroyed in the Great New Orleans Fire. The building took its name from the colonial governing body, the "Illustrious Cabildo," or city council. The Cabildo was the site of the Louisiana Purchase transfer ceremonies in 1803, and continued to be used by the New Orleans city council until the mid-1850s. The building's main hall, the Sala Capitular ("Capitol Room"), was originally utilized as a courtroom. The Spanish used the courtroom from 1799 to 1803, and from 1803 to 1812, it was used by the Louisiana territorial superior court. After the American Civil War, it was the home of the Louisiana Supreme Court from 1868 to 1910. The Sala Capitular was the site of several landmark court cases, including Plessy v. Ferguson. In 1911 the Cabildo became the home of the Louisiana State Museum.
Maine	Old Lincoln County Courthouse		1761	Built in 1761, judges and lawyers who served or appeared here include Robert Treat Paine, Benedict Arnold, William Cushing, and James Sullivan. Today it is a museum.
Maryland	Former Queen Anne County Courthouse		1708	Built in 1708, it is likely the oldest courthouse still standing in the United States. Today the property is open as a museum.
Massachusetts	Plymouth Courthouse		1749	Built in 1749 of wood, it served as a courthouse until 1820. It also served local municipal uses from 1749 until the 1950s. It was opened as a museum in 1970.
Michigan	1839 Courthouse Museum		1839	
Minnesota	Washington County Courthouse		1870	Built in 1870, it is still used today for other civil functions.
Nevada	Genoa Courthouse		1865	This 1865 building was first the government seat, then a school, and now a museum.
New Hampshire	Old Grafton County Courthouse		1774	Built in 1774, this building was the site of Daniel Webster's first criminal case in 1805 and served as a courthouse until 1823. It thereafter served as a public library for many years and is now maintained as a museum.
North Dakota	Stutsman County Courthouse		1883	The structure, built in 1883, is the oldest remaining courthouse in the state.
Ohio	Chester Courthouse		1823	Built in 1823, this building is Ohio's oldest standing courthouse and is today a museum.
Oregon	Pioneer Courthouse		1875	Built in 1875, this is the oldest extant federal building in the Pacific Northwest.
Pennsylvania	Old Chester Courthouse		1724	Built in 1724, this is the oldest public building in continuous use in the United States; it still serves other public functions to this day. See earlier sections for greater detail on this building.
Rhode Island	White Horse Tavern		1673	Constructed before 1673 in Newport, it is one of the oldest active tavern buildings in the United States and once served for large meetings including use as a Rhode Island General Assembly meeting place, a court house, and a city hall. As of 2008, it still remains a popular drinking and dining location.
Texas	"Old Cora" Courthouse		1856	The 1856 split-log, one-roomed courthouse served as a post office as well as district court.
Utah	Territorial Statehouse		1855	The Utah Territorial Statehouse in Fillmore, built from 1852–1855, served as the first territorial statehouse. The building later served as a courthouse for Millard County. The building in Fillmore is now the Utah Territorial Statehouse State Park Museum.
Washington	Territorial Courthouse		1858	Built in 1858, it is Washington's oldest brick building. It has served many purposes over time including as a courthouse.
West Virginia	West Liberty Courthouse		1778	Built in 1778–79. Old West Liberty Courthouse (in the town previously called "Black's Cabin," in Ohio County, then Virginia). Oldest Courthouse constructed west of the Allegheny Mountains. Log structure used as a Courthouse until 1798, when Wheeling, Virginia, was selected as the site of the county Courthouse. The building then was converted into a grist mill, and later used as a residence. Demolished in 2020

== See also ==
- List of courthouses in the United States
- List of United States federal courthouses
- Oldest buildings in the United States
