= Perth Amboy City Hall =

- Perth Amboy City Hall and Surveyor General's Office
- U.S. National Register of Historic Places
- New Jersey Register of Historic Places
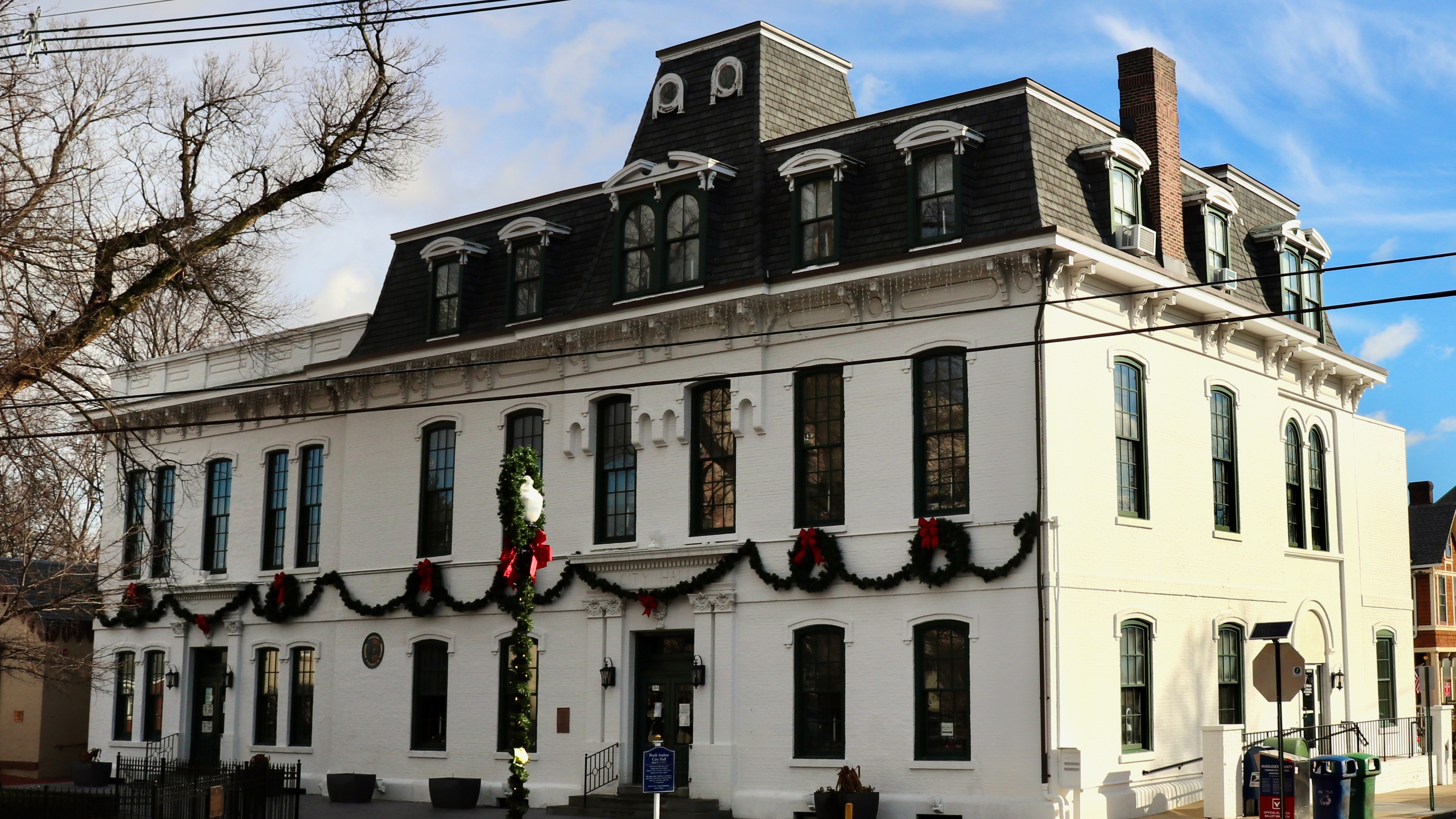
- City Hall in 2023

- Location within Middlesex County, New Jersey Location within New Jersey Location within the United States
- Location: 260 High Street; Perth Amboy, New Jersey USA
- Coordinates: 40°30′23″N 74°15′57″W
- Built: 1714
- Architectural style: Colonial Revival, Second Empire, Italianate
- NRHP reference No.: 81000394
- NJRHP No.: 1897

Significant dates
- Added to NRHP: January 12, 1981
- Designated NJRHP: October 3, 1980

Perth Amboy City Hall
- Interactive map of the Perth Amboy City Hall area

General information
- Type: city hall
- Location: Perth Amboy, New Jersey
- Construction started: 1714
- Completed: 1717
- Renovated: 1745, 1767, 1826, 1872, 2006

City Hall in Perth Amboy, Middlesex County, New Jersey, United States, is a historic building built in the early 18th century. It is now the oldest public building in continuous use in the United States. The Perth Amboy City Hall and the Surveyor General's Office were added to the National Register of Historic Places on January 12, 1981, for their significance in architecture and politics/government.

== History ==
Construction of the building began in 1714 and was completed in 1717. It served as the local courthouse and jail, and was also used by the Provincial Assembly until 1775. The building has twice been rebuilt after being badly damaged by fire; first in 1731, rebuilt until 1745, and again around 1765 following an arson attack believed to have been committed by a former inmate who was imprisoned on debt charges. It was rebuilt a second time in 1767.

City Hall has undergone three renovations, most recently in 2006, although some of the original structure remains. The building is now Victorian in style.

The two-room Surveyor General's Office was built adjacent to City Hall in 1867, which was used by the General Board of Proprietors of the Eastern Division of New Jersey.

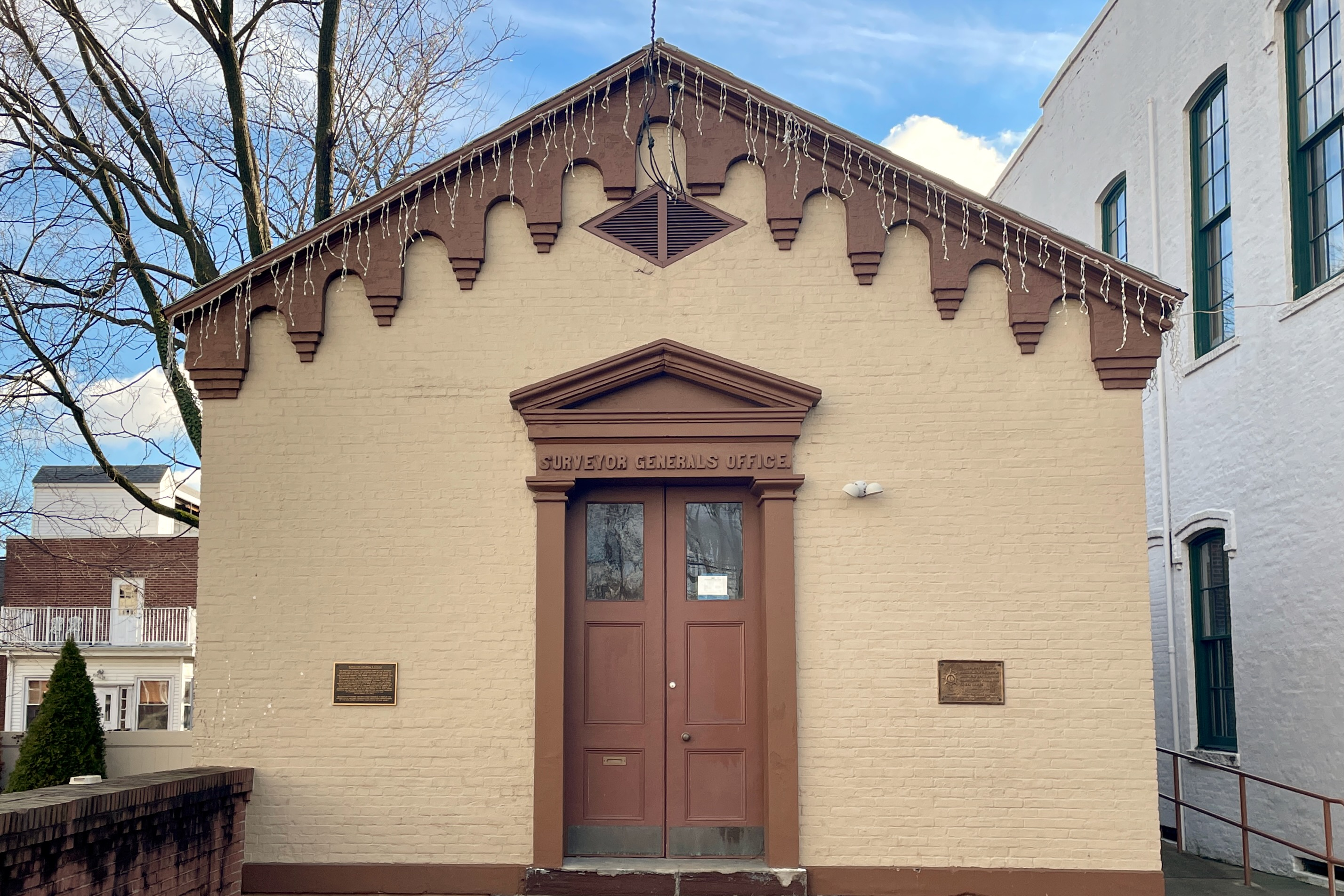
Surveyor General's Office

== Notable events ==
On November 20, 1789, the State of New Jersey became the first to ratify the United States Bill of Rights.

On March 31, 1870 Thomas Mundy Peterson (1824–1904) became the first African American to vote in an election under the just-enacted provisions of the 15th Amendment to the United States Constitution.

On February 22, 1896, the terra cotta statue of George Washington by Nels N. Alling is dedicated in Market Square, next to the City Hall. It was a gift of the Scandinavians of Perth Amboy.

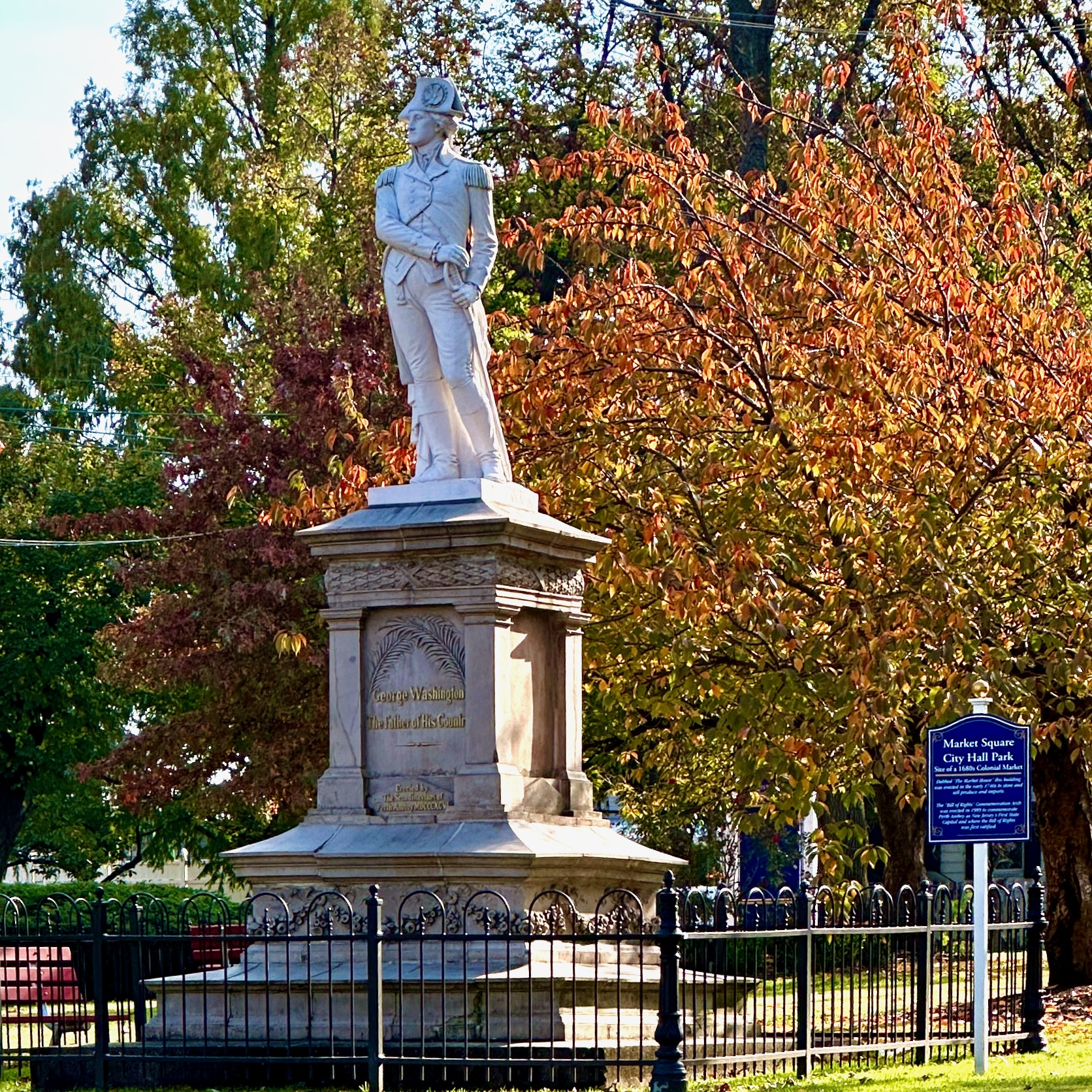
George Washington by Nels N. Alling in Market Square, next to City Hall

== See also ==
- List of the oldest buildings in the United States
- List of the oldest courthouses in the United States
- List of the oldest buildings in New Jersey
- National Register of Historic Places listings in Middlesex County, New Jersey
