= Statue of George Washington (Perth Amboy, New Jersey) =

1896 statue by Nels N. Alling in Perth Amboy, New Jersey

George Washington
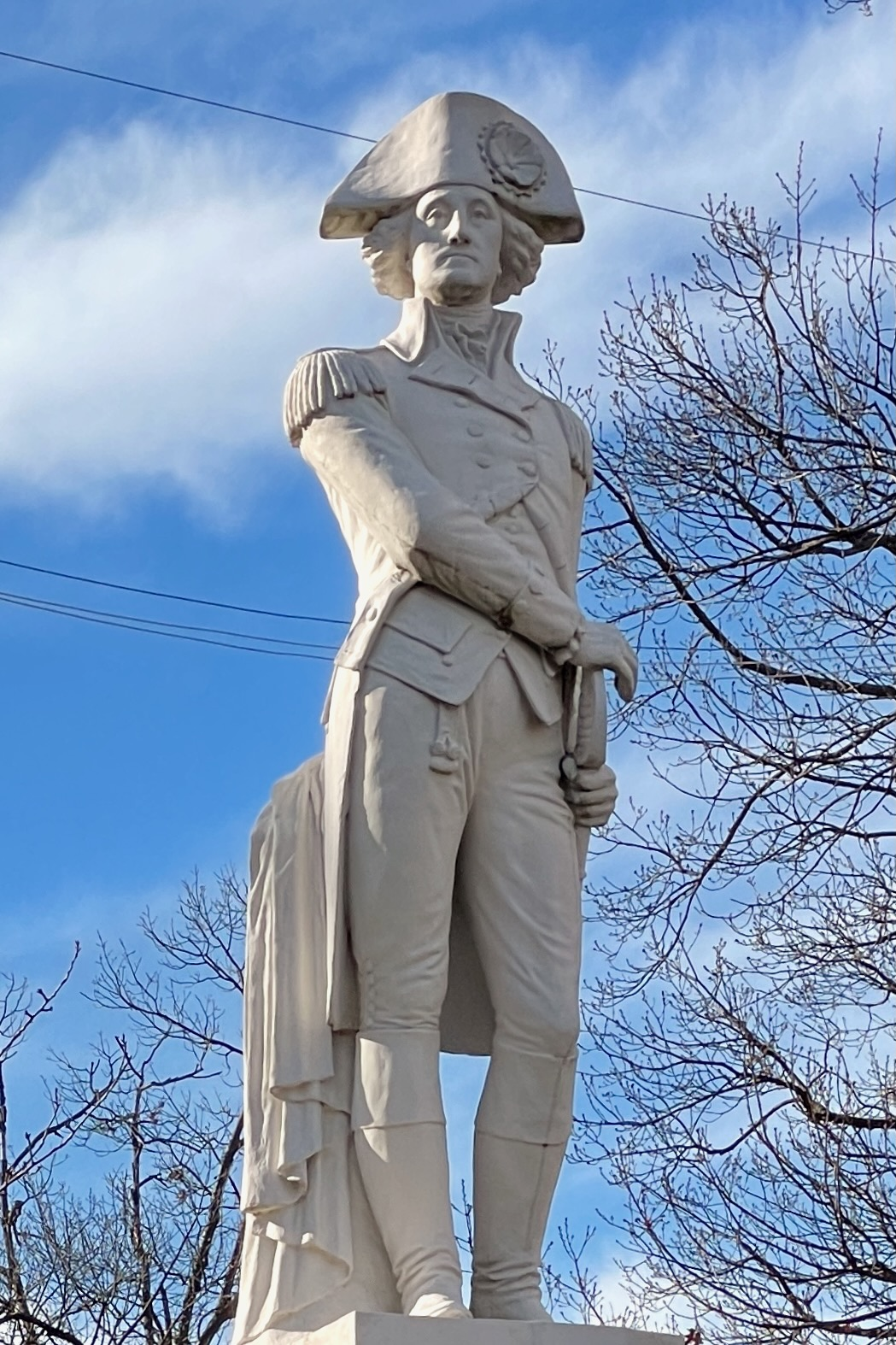
- George Washington by Nels N. Alling

- Location within Middlesex County, New Jersey Location within New Jersey Location within the United States
- Artist: Nels N. Alling
- Year: Dedicated February 22, 1896
- Medium: Terra cotta
- Subject: George Washington
- Dimensions: 1.8 m × 0.61 m × 0.61 m (6 ft × 2 ft × 2 ft)
- Location: Market Square, Perth Amboy, New Jersey, United States; 40°30′23.6″N 74°15′57.3″W

George Washington is a life-size terra cotta statue by the Danish-American sculptor Nels N. Alling and located in the city of Perth Amboy in Middlesex County, New Jersey, United States. The statue of General George Washington was a gift of the Scandinavians of Perth Amboy and dedicated on February 22, 1896.

== Background ==
General Washington viewed Perth Amboy, then the colonial capital of New Jersey, as important in the defense of New York City during the American Revolutionary War. In June 1776, he established a flying camp, a strategic reserve unit, in the city with General Hugh Mercer in command.

Perth Amboy was the heart of the Clay District for the production of terra cotta, baked earth, from 1870 to 1930. Manufacturers made architectural terra cotta in bold colors. One of the largest, the Perth Amboy Terra Cotta Company, was incorporated in 1879 by Alfred Hall. The work attracted immigration from Denmark, England, Hungary, and Italy.

== Commission ==
On Labor Day, 1894, Scandinavian immigrants in Perth Amboy had a parade highlighting local industries and including a float with a bust of George Washington. Afterwards the Scandinavian community formed a committee and were granted permission from the city council to erect a statue of Washington. Sculptor Nels N. Alling, who had immigrated from Denmark in 1887, modeled the statue in his studio. It was fired in the kilns of the New Jersey Terra Cotta Company, owned by Danes who had been employed at the Perth Amboy Terra Cotta Company. Funding for the project was done entirely by the Danish and Scandinavian community of Perth Amboy. The statue was unveiled on Labor Day, September 2, 1895, and dedicated on Washington's Birthday, February 22, 1896.

== Description ==
The life-size 6-foot (1.8 m) terra cotta statue, on a 10-foot (3.0 m) pedestal, is located in Market Square, next to the Perth Amboy City Hall, and facing north along High Street. Washington is shown upright in a traditional military uniform and tricorner hat with cockade. On his left side, he is sheathing his sword, held in his right hand, representing his leadership during the war. Alling signed his name on the base. The pedestal has the inscription "George Washington, The Father of His Country". In 1983, the Danish Brotherhood in American had the statue restored for the 300th anniversary of the city. Further repairs were made in 1985.

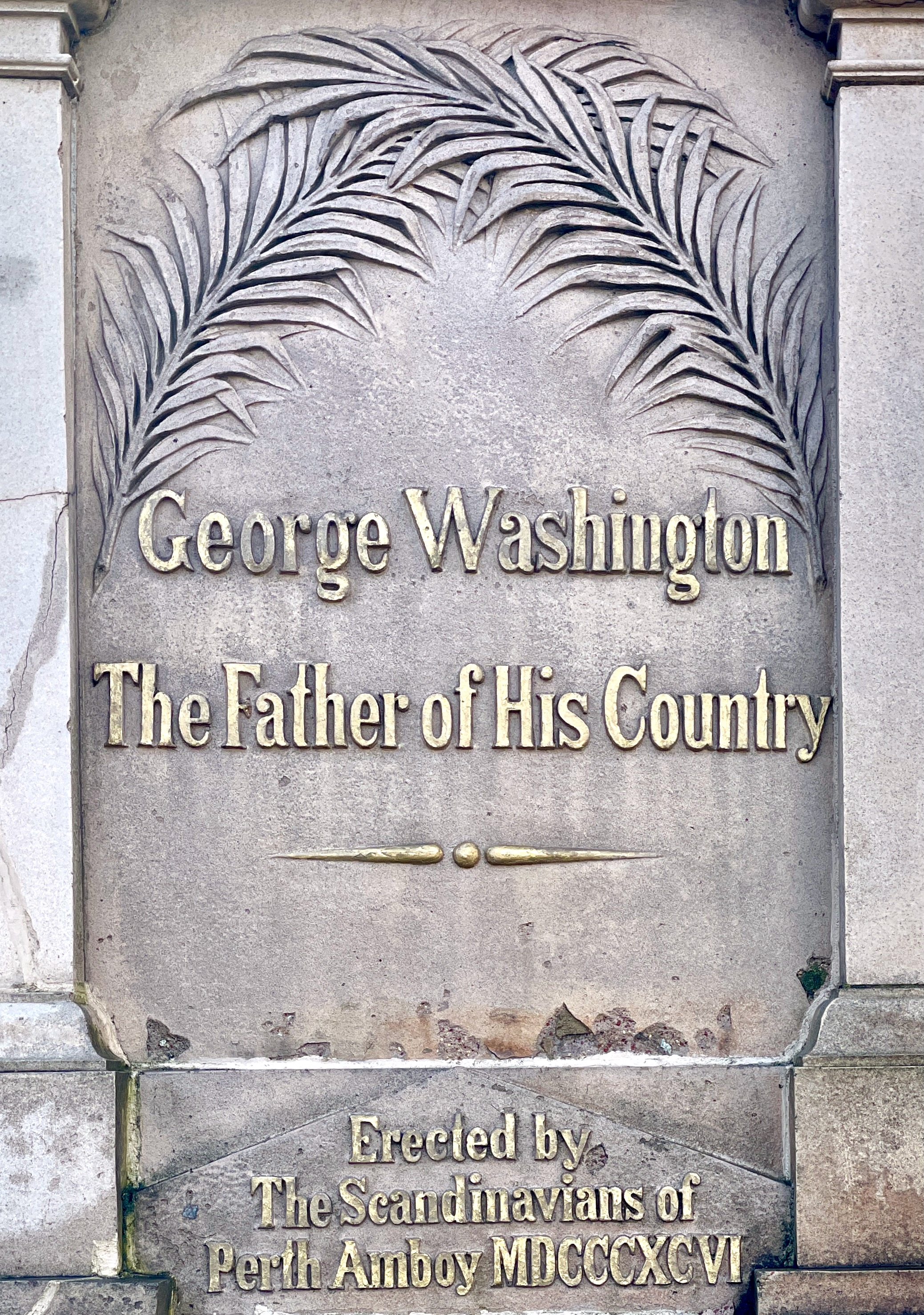
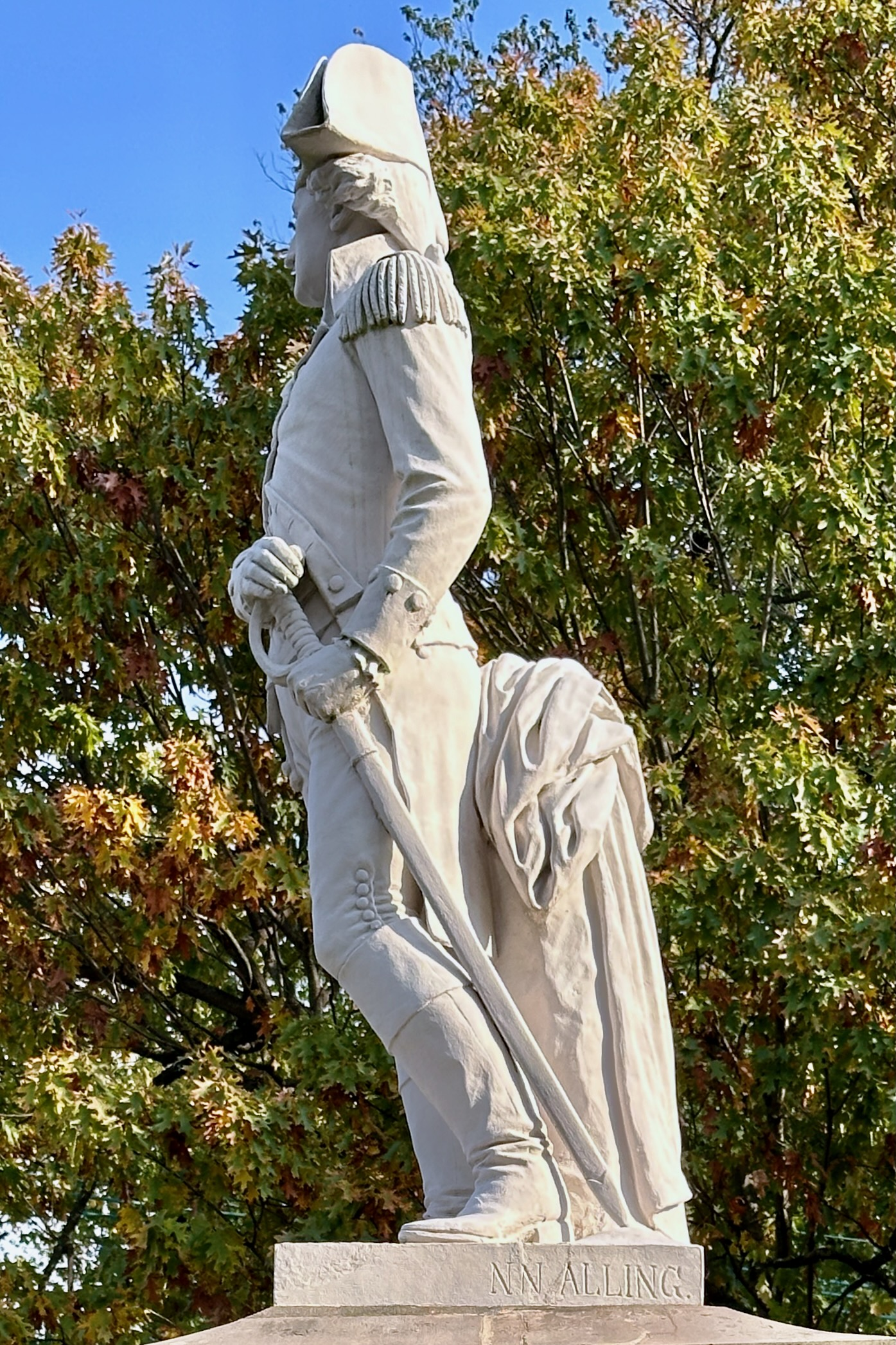
Profile view,
Alling's name on the base

George Washington
The Father of His Country
———
Erected by
The Scandinavians of
Perth Amboy, MDCCCXCVI

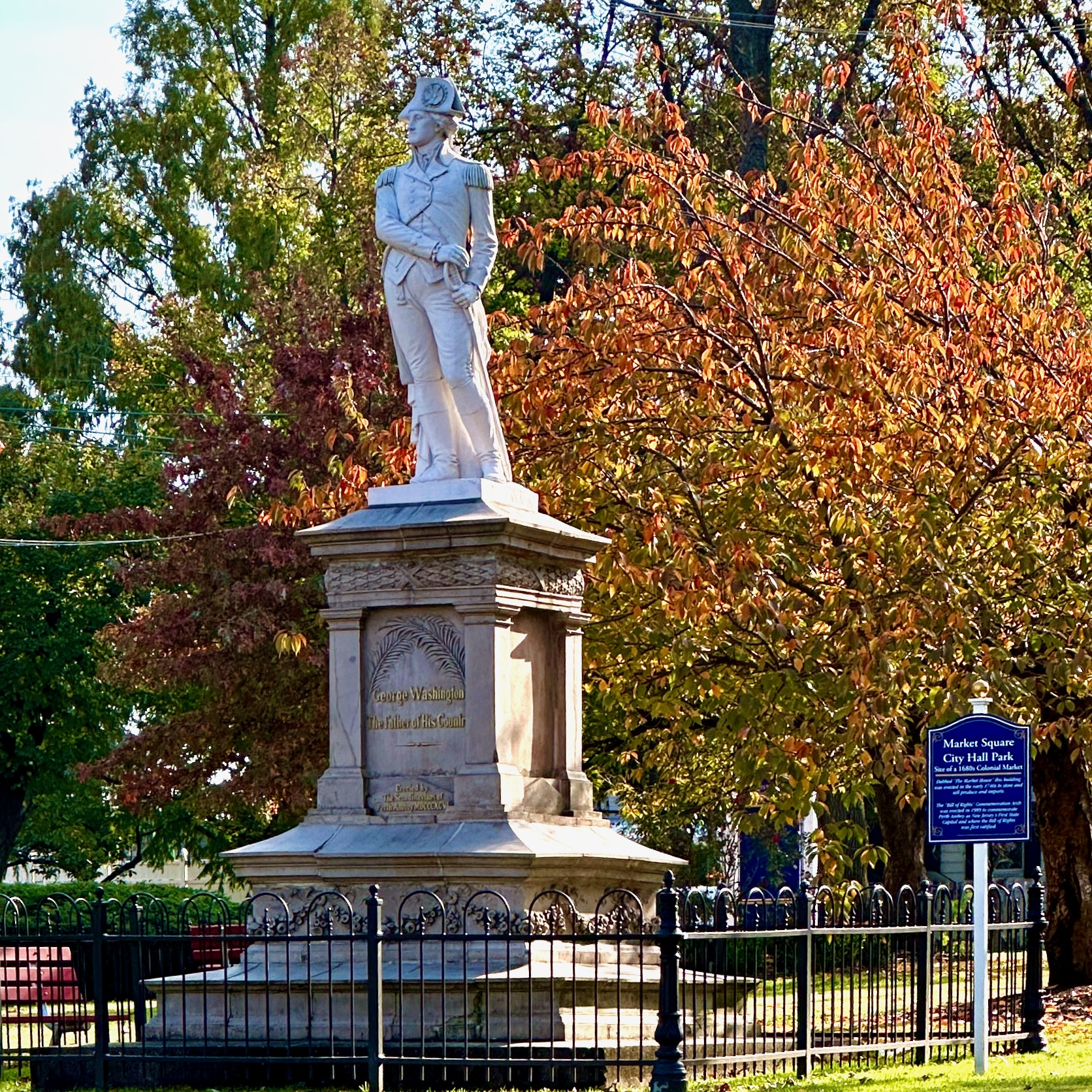
Statue on pedestal,
Market Square

== See also ==
- 1896 in art
- List of sculptures of presidents of the United States
- List of statues of George Washington
- New Jersey in the American Revolution
