= Nels N. Alling =

Danish-American sculptor (1861–1955)

- Born: October 15, 1861; Randers, Denmark
- Died: March 9, 1955 (aged 93); Fords, New Jersey, US
- Resting place: Alpine Cemetery, Perth Amboy, New Jersey
- Known for: Terra cotta sculpture
- Notable work: Statue of George Washington

Nels N. Alling (October 15, 1861 – March 9, 1955) was a Danish-American sculptor who specialized in terra cotta architectural work in the city of Perth Amboy in Middlesex County, New Jersey, United States. He is known for his life-size terra cotta statue of George Washington located in the city's Market Square.

== Career ==
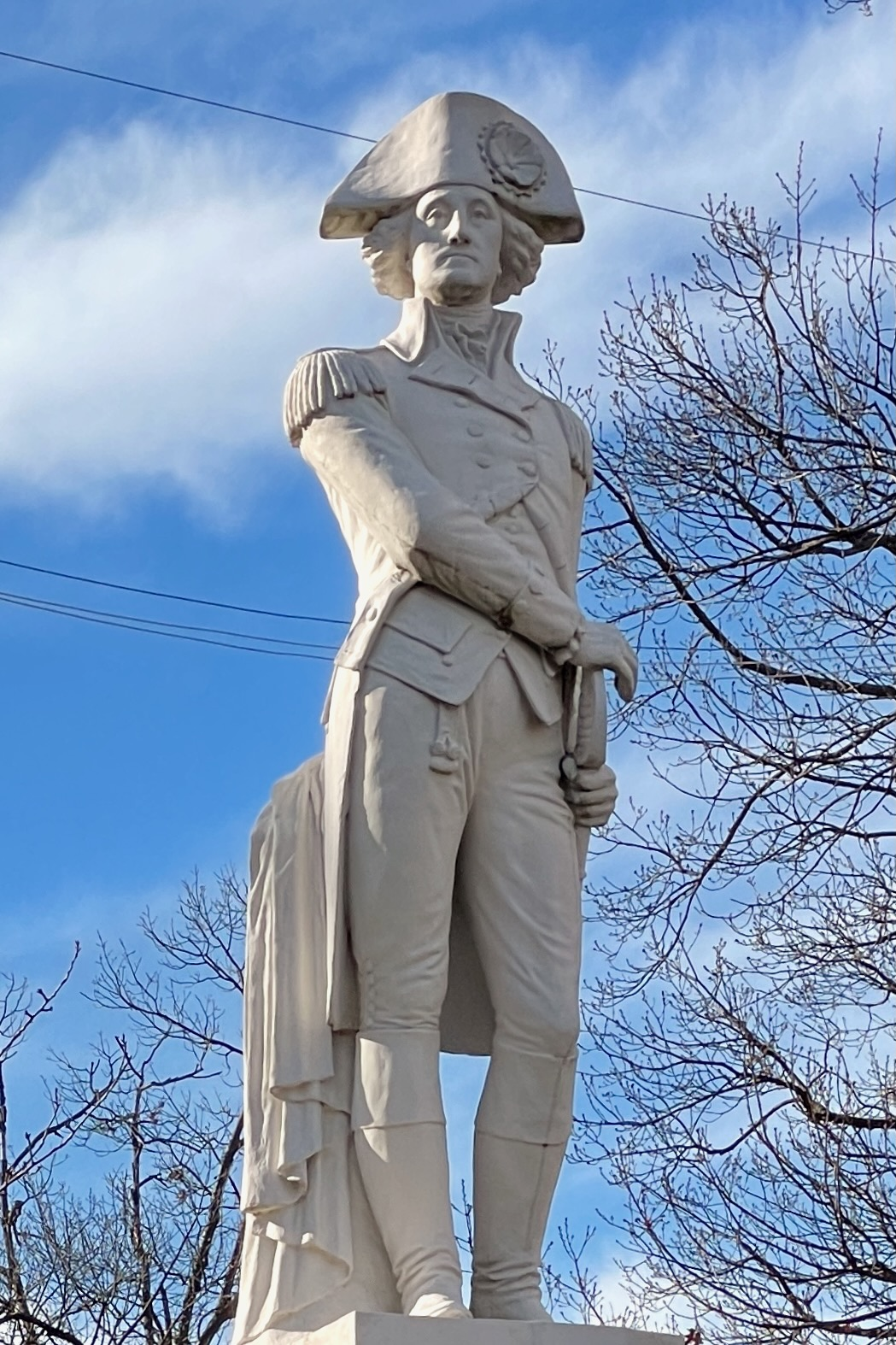
George Washington, Market Square, Perth Amboy

Alling studied art in Denmark, and had been recognized for his work by Danish king Christian IX. He immigrated to the United States in 1887 and started work at the Perth Amboy Terra Cotta Company. He had come to New Jersey as he later recalled, because:

I heard that top-flight workers in terra cotta could earn as much as 55 cents an hour, which was a fantastic sum of money in my estimation in those days.

At the time, Perth Amboy had several terra cotta manufacturing companies and attracted skilled workers from several countries, including Denmark and Sweden. In 1895, Alling received a commission for a life-size terra cotta statue of George Washington, which he modeled in his studio. The statue was a gift from the Scandinavians of Perth Amboy and dedicated on Washington's Birthday, February 22, 1896, in Market Square, in front of the Perth Amboy City Hall. Alling's daughter unveiled the statue at the ceremony, which featured speeches by the mayor and Scandinavians of the city.

Alling created terra cotta statuary for several New York City buildings, including the now demolished New York Hippodrome. He also sculpted several other statues and is thought to have made many gravemarkers in Perth Amboy. He later operated a funerary monuments and headstones business.

== Personal life ==
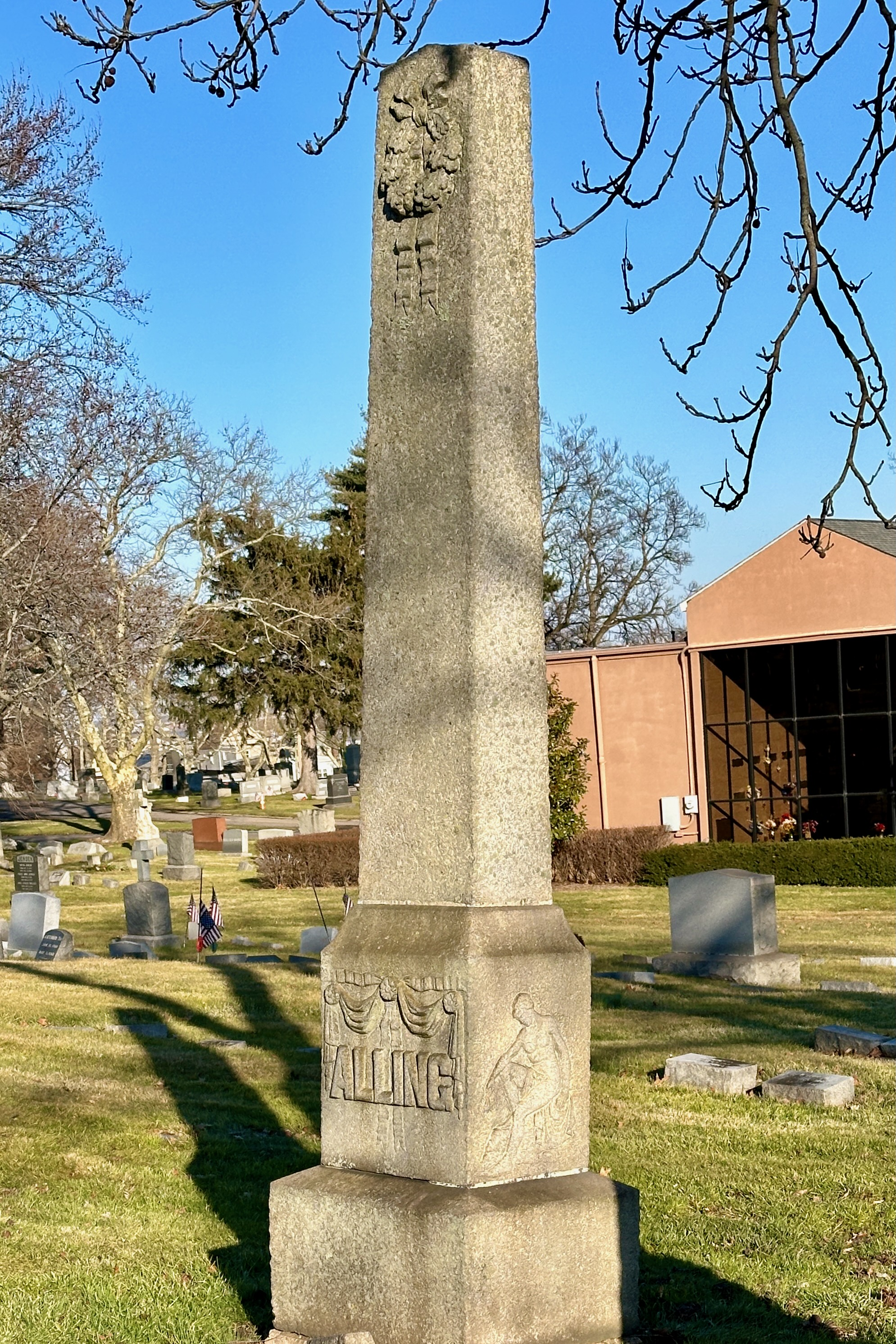
Alling monument, Alpine Cemetery

Alling was born on October 15, 1861, in the city of Randers in Denmark. He married Wilhelmina Charlotte Weedfald in July 1887 and soon emigrated to New Jersey. He died on March 9, 1955, at his home in the Fords section of Woodbridge Township and was buried at the Alpine Cemetery in Perth Amboy.

== See also ==
- Architectural sculpture
- List of sculptors
