= Nicholas Jarrot Mansion =

- U.S. National Register of Historic Places
- U.S. National Historic Landmark
- Illinois State Historic Site
- The mansion from the northeast in 2020

- Location within Illinois Location within the United States
- Location: 124 E 1st St, Sauget, Illinois
- Coordinates: 38°34′12″N 90°11′15″W
- Area: 1 acre (0.40 ha)
- Built: 1810
- NRHP reference No.: 74002197

Significant dates
- Added to NRHP: November 19, 1974
- Designated NHL: August 07, 2001

The Nicholas Jarrot Mansion is a historic house at 124 East First Street in Cahokia Heights, Illinois and is operated as an inactive historic site by the Illinois Historic Preservation Agency (IHPA). It is a State Historic Site, is listed on the National Register of Historic Places, and became a National Historic Landmark in 2001. Built in 1807–1810 for the son of French colonists, it is an extremely rare example of Federal architecture in the upper Mississippi River valley.

== Nicholas Jarrot ==
Nicholas Jarrot (1764–1820) was a fur trader, lawyer, county judge, businessman, and developer who owned 25,000 acres (100 km²) of land at the peak of his success. He tried to lead and manage the transition of his community, originally citizens of the French colony of Louisiana, by the mid-18th century under rule by Great Britain, as it was transformed in the late 18th and early 19th centuries into what became known as the American Bottom. The east bank of the Mississippi River, including what is now southwestern Illinois, had been ceded by Great Britain to the United States following the American Revolution by the Treaty of Paris in 1783.

As a pro-American merchant with business ties to the new republic, Jarrot was recommended to the westward-bound explorer Meriwether Lewis in 1803. Lewis met Jarrot in December of that year and won the merchant's permission to encamp his men on one of Jarrot's properties, a riverfront tract across from the mouth of the Missouri River. This winter encampment of 1803–1804 became Camp Dubois, the shakedown site of the Lewis and Clark Expedition.

== Construction ==
As a reflection of his business success and ability to fit in with the incoming English-speaking frontiersmen, Jarrot decided to construct an American-style house. The Jarrot Mansion was built to resemble the houses of successful families on the U.S. East Coast, rather than the French Colonial style that continued to be followed by the French-speaking community leaders in places such as Sainte Genevieve, Missouri.

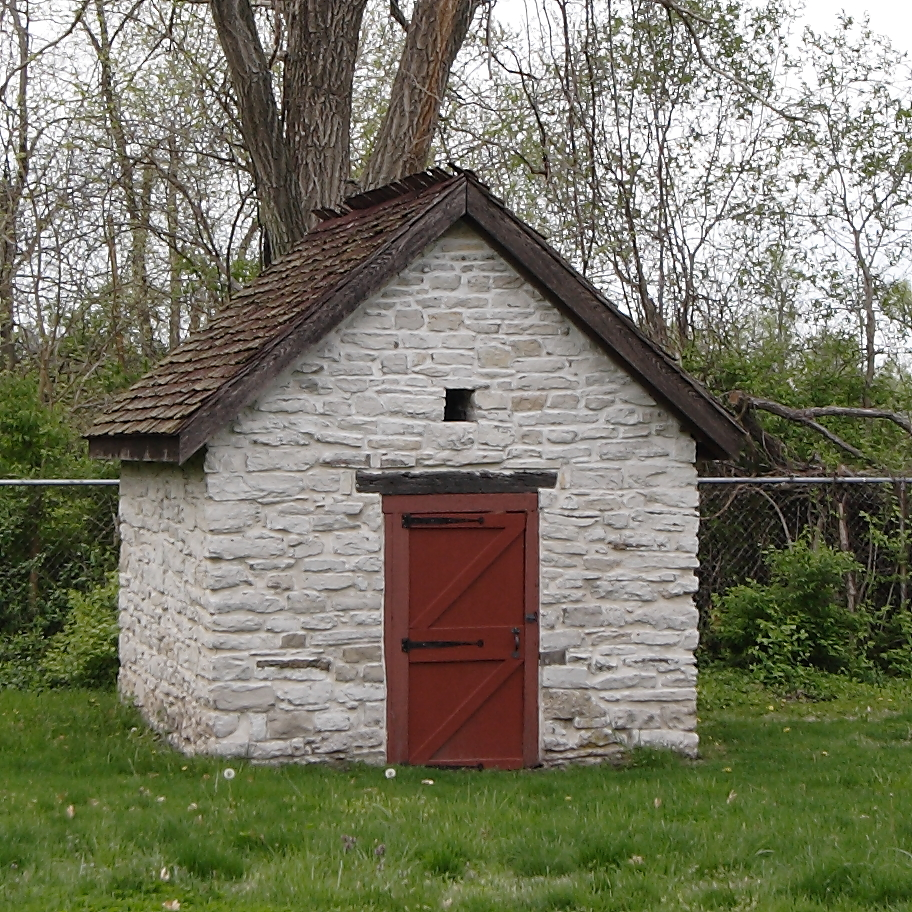
The mansion's springhouse

The Jarrot Mansion was built by masons who were not used to working with bricks, and so its windows are slightly askew and the facade of the house is asymmetrical. The house and its facade have an appealing quirkiness, and appear to be more vernacular than the owner may have wished. The house was sturdily built, however, and survived the major 1811–12 New Madrid earthquakes that had their epicenter at New Madrid, Missouri.

The mansion complex includes a spring house built of cut limestone. Spring houses like that of the Jarrot Mansion contained tubs of cool water in which foodstuffs were protected from spoilage for short periods of time.

== Preservation ==
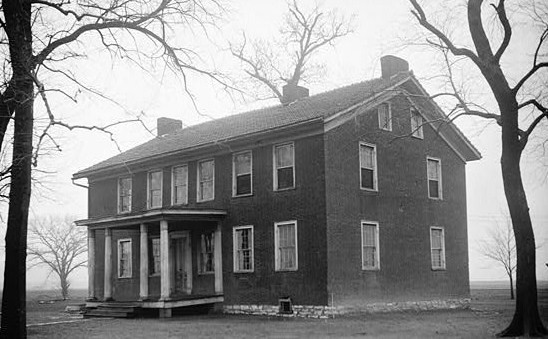
Mansion with porch in 1934

The Jarrot Mansion was added to the National Register of Historic Places in 1974. A predecessor agency to the IHPA acquired the house in 1980. The house was elevated to the rank of a National Historic Landmark in 2001. As of 2008, the mansion is a largely inactive historic site. The IHPA keeps it closed to the public except for periodic seasonal open-house festivals.

The Jarrot Mansion is located less than one-half mile from the Cahokia Courthouse State Historic Site, where Jarrot served as judge of St. Clair County.
