= Old Cahokia Courthouse =

- U.S. National Register of Historic Places
- Illinois State Historic Site
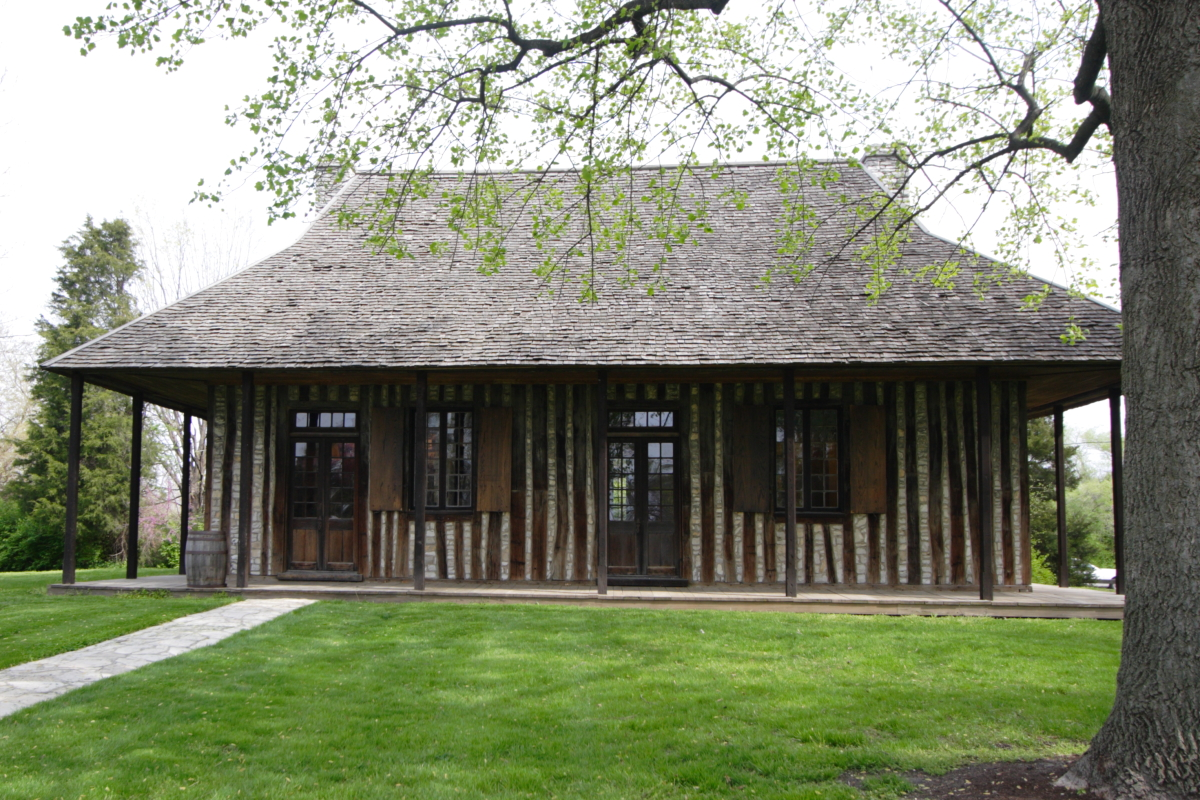
- Old Cahokia Courthouse

- Location within Illinois Location within the United States
- Location: Cahokia Heights, Illinois
- Coordinates: 38°34′14.75″N 90°11′30.16″W
- Built: c. 1740
- Architectural style: French Colonial, Poteaux-sur-solle
- NRHP reference No.: 72001480
- Added to NRHP: November 9, 1972

The Cahokia Courthouse State Historic Site is a reconstructed French-Canadian structure built about 1740 at what is now 107 Elm Street, Cahokia Heights, Illinois. At various times it has served as a house and as a courthouse. It is currently interpreted to resemble its appearance about 1800 as a frontier courthouse of the Northwest Territory. The courthouse was listed on the National Register of Historic Places on November 9, 1972.

The old Cahokia log home is believed to have been built in 1737 as a four-room private residence by Jean le Poincet and acquired in later years by Jean Francois Saucier, son of the designer of Fort de Chartres, from his first wife's family as her dowry. It was here that Jean Francois Saucier's six children with his first two wives, Marguerite Cadron and Angelique Lapensee were born. His other eight children with third wife Marie Francoise Nicolle were born and raised in Missouri. It is the oldest house in Illinois as well as the mid-west.

== French period ==
Following the explorations of Marquette, Jolliet and La Salle in the 1670s, the Mississippi Valley became part of New France. The adventurous French had mapped more territory than their numbers could settle, but their attention soon focused on a section of the valley south of the mouth of the Missouri River. In this region, which would later be known as the American Bottom, the alluvial soil was exceptionally fertile, and the local Native Americans, members of the Illiniwek nation or Illinois Confederacy, were friendly to the newcomers.

In the early 18th century, French-speaking immigrants, mostly from Canada, settled villages in the American Bottom such as Kaskaskia, Prairie du Rocher, and Cahokia. They lived in harmony with the Indians and named several of their villages, such as Cahokia, after constituent tribes of the Illiniwek who lived nearby.

The building now known as the Cahokia Courthouse traces its ancestry back to a French-Canadian log cabin built by one of these settlers about 1740. In line with his group's customary architecture, the unknown builder built the cabin with logs raised vertically. This was different from having the logs placed horizontally, as had become the custom among English-speaking frontiersmen farther east. The French colonial building style is called poteaux-sur-sol (French:post on sill) construction, with the building's posts grounded in a foundation sill to retard wood rot.

== American Bottom ==
Following the American Revolution and the Treaty of Paris in 1783, the Cahokia region was transferred with the rest of the east bank of the Mississippi from Great Britain to the new United States. The alluvial region, east of the river, came to be known as the American Bottom, to distinguish it from the west bank of the river, at that time a colony of Spain.

The American frontiersmen were jealous of their right to govern themselves in local communities, and invested a substantial amount of their very limited resources to set up a legal infrastructure of local self-government. On April 27, 1790, St. Clair County, Illinois, the first county located within the Illinois region of the Northwest Territory, was organized. Soon afterwards, the 1740 Cahokia house, an unusually well-built structure, was promoted to the status of a courthouse for the new county.

Territorial law books describe the kind of decisions and court cases that were made and heard in this small building. Land titles and transfers were registered here. Certain types of businesses, such as frontier taverns and ferryboats, required licenses that were issued from this building. Criminal cases were heard, and votes were counted.

In 1804 the federal government opened its first Illinois land office, in Kaskaskia, to sell former Native American land to settlers. Soon the population of St. Clair County grew far too large for the small log cabin to be adequate as a courthouse.

== Reconstructions ==
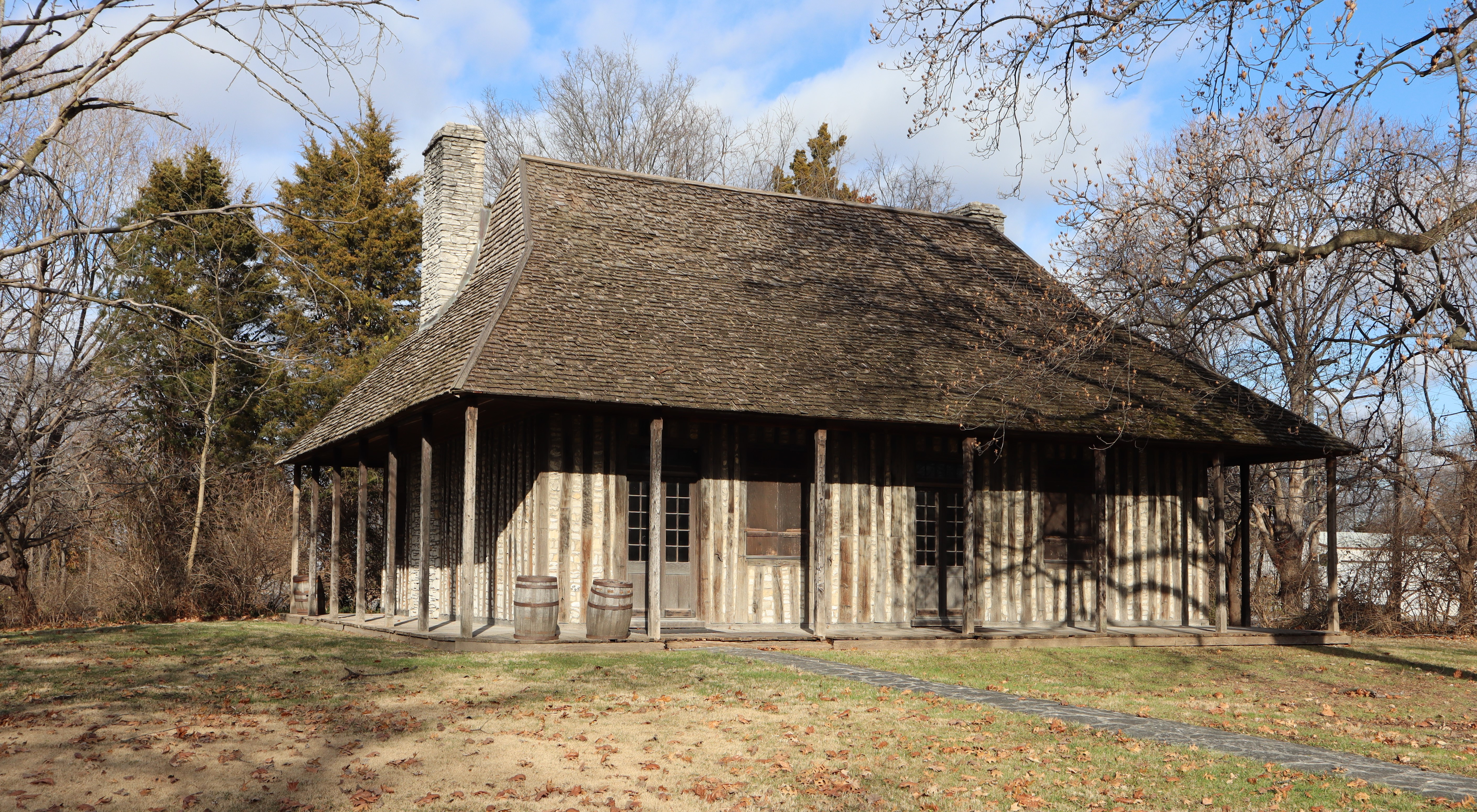
Courthouse in December 2021

In 1904, promoters for the St. Louis World's Fair discovered the old Cahokia courthouse, which by this time had become one of the oldest surviving buildings in Illinois. They bought it, dismantled it, and carried the surviving posts and other wooden pieces across the river to St. Louis for rebuilding as a fair attraction.

The courthouse appears to have survived this experience and to have excited interest from Illinoisans. At the end of the fair, the cabin was again dismantled, this time for a 1906 rebuilding in Jackson Park in Chicago.

Cahokia residents resented the fact that their oldest building had been moved to the opposite end of the state, and successfully lobbied in the 1920s for the old log cabin to be purchased and reconstructed a third time on its original site.

By this time, however, very little of the 1740 cabin remained. Each act of dismantling and reconstruction had replaced much of the original wood with new timbers. The third reconstruction was mostly a new building. The state of Illinois stated that the rebuilt Cahokia courthouse contained some pieces of timber from the original structure.

== Today ==
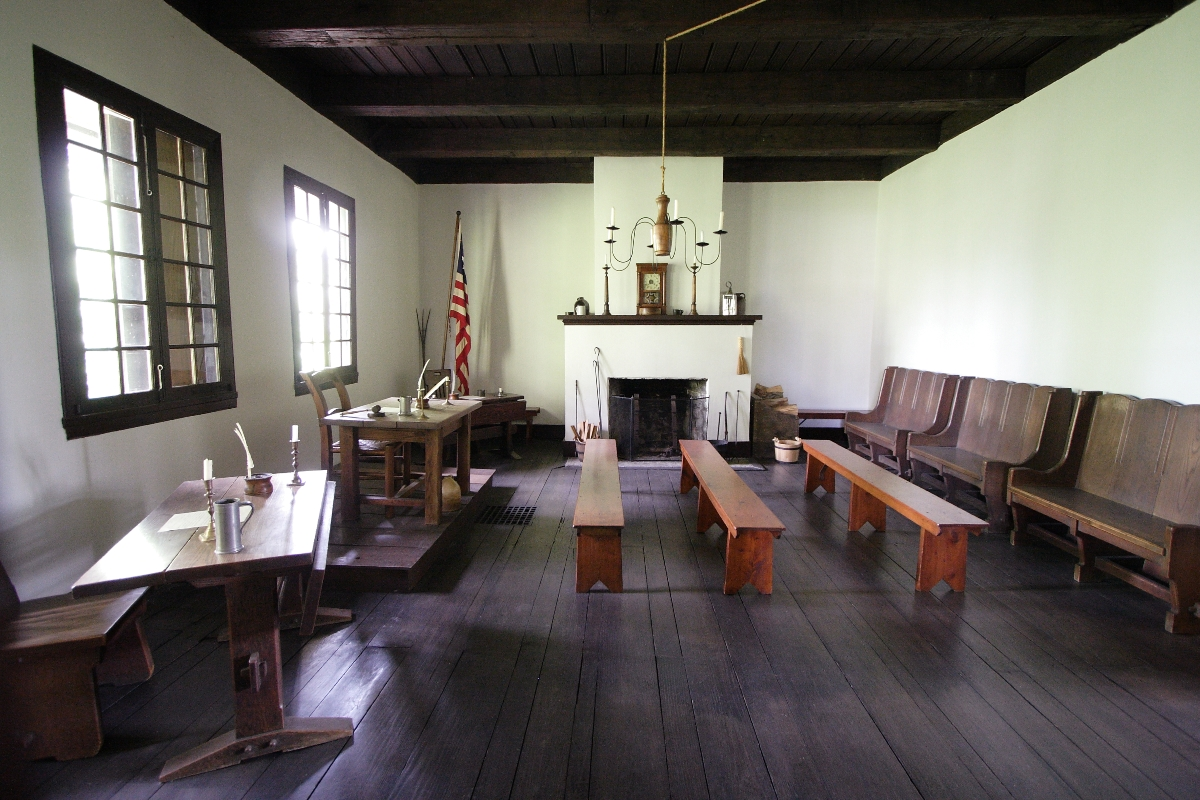
Old Cahokia Courthouse interior, which had a very small courtroom

The reconstructed Cahokia Courthouse is a historic site of the state of Illinois and is one of the oldest in the United States. Since 1985, it has been under the jurisdiction of the Illinois Historic Preservation Agency (IHPA). Exhibits focus on the issues dealt with by the court around 1800, and the history of the structure's physical movements. A visitor center also features exhibits about the area's occupation by the French in the 18th century, as well as the nearby Nicholas Jarrot Mansion.

Due to state budget cuts, the IHPA temporarily closed the Cahokia Courthouse to the public from December 2008 until April 2009.
