= 1724 Chester Courthouse =

- Chester Courthouse
- U.S. National Register of Historic Places
- Pennsylvania state historical marker
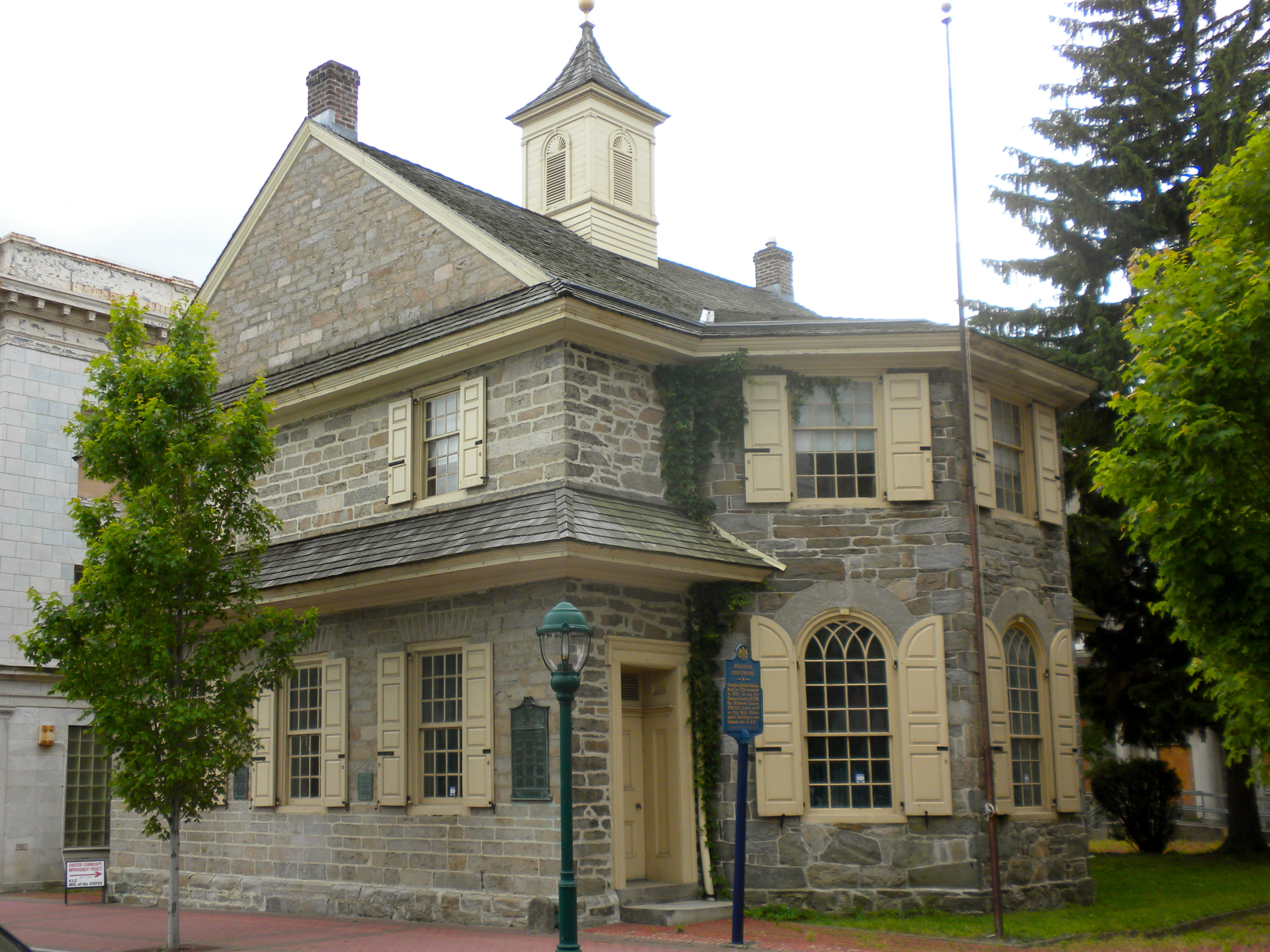
- 1724 Chester Courthouse, May 2010

- Location within Pennsylvania Location within the United States
- Location: Avenue of the States St. below 5th St., Chester, Pennsylvania
- Coordinates: 39.8478°N 75.3599°W
- Area: less than one acre
- Built: 1724
- Architects: Brazer, Clarence
- NRHP reference No.: 71000702

Significant dates
- Added to NRHP: May 27, 1971
- Designated PHMC: May 14, 1954

The Chester Courthouse is a historic courthouse in Chester, Pennsylvania that served as the Chester County courthouse from 1724 to 1789, the Delaware County courthouse from 1789 to 1850 and the City Hall for the city of Chester. It was built in 1724 and is the oldest public building still standing in the United States.

== Description ==
The German Colonial-style courthouse is 2½ stories high with no basement and 2-foot-thick walls. The south and east facades of the building are hewn stone, with the other two built of rubble stone. The Quaker influence on the building can be seen in the two front doors, one for men and the other for women.

The interior measures 31 by 36 feet (9.4 by 11.0 m). The first level has a stone-floored court room divided by a low wooden railing designed to separate the judges and lawyers from court observers. There are no fireplaces on the first floor, but both the jury room and petit jury room on the second floor have fireplaces. The second floor is accessed by a stairwell in the northwest corner of the building.

The cupola on the courthouse contained a bell that was cast in London and added in 1729. The bell was removed for many years but returned during a 1920 restoration. A three-sided bay with large multi-paneled windows was added in 1744.

== History ==
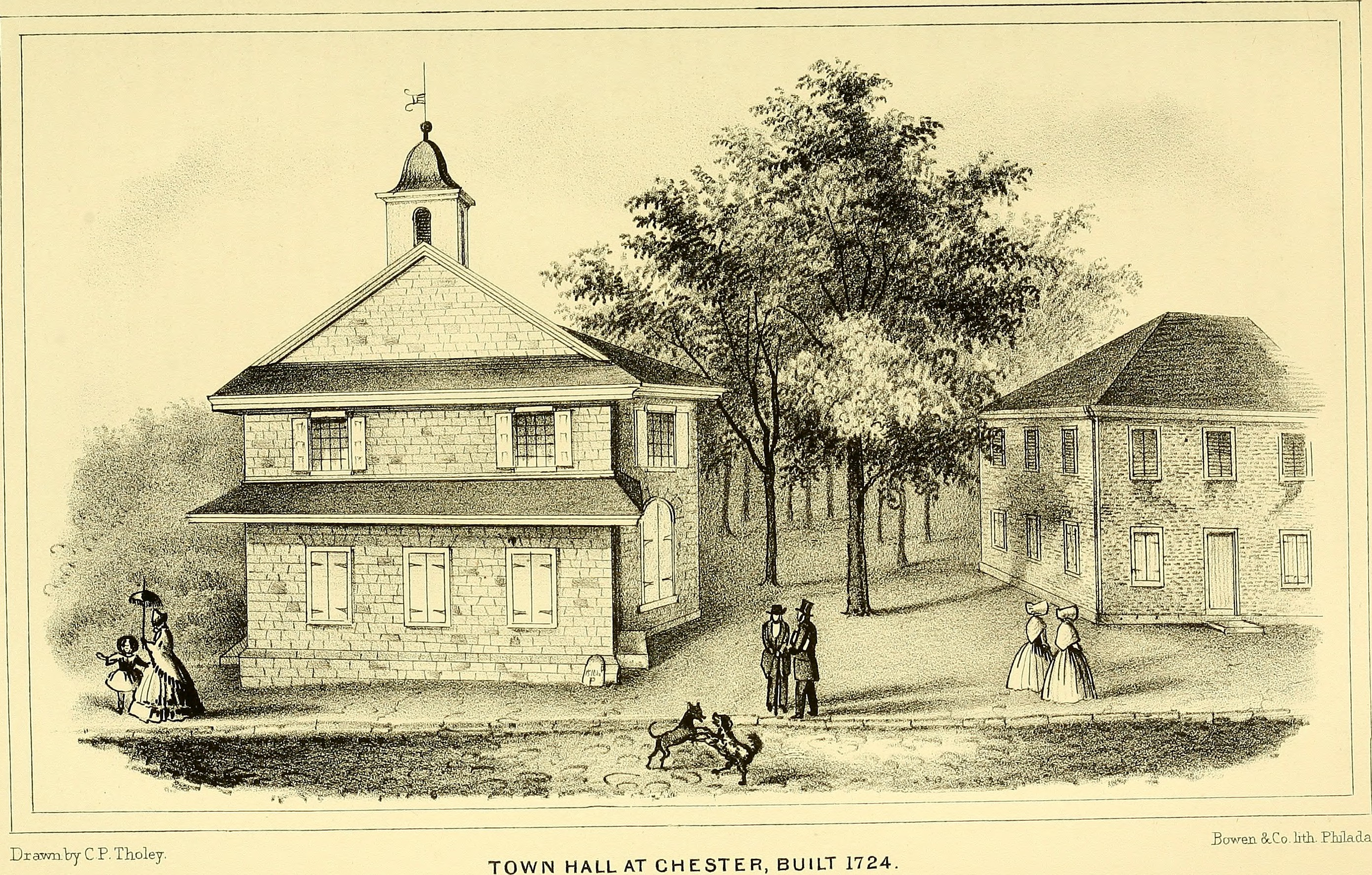
Drawing from Smith's History of Delaware County 1862

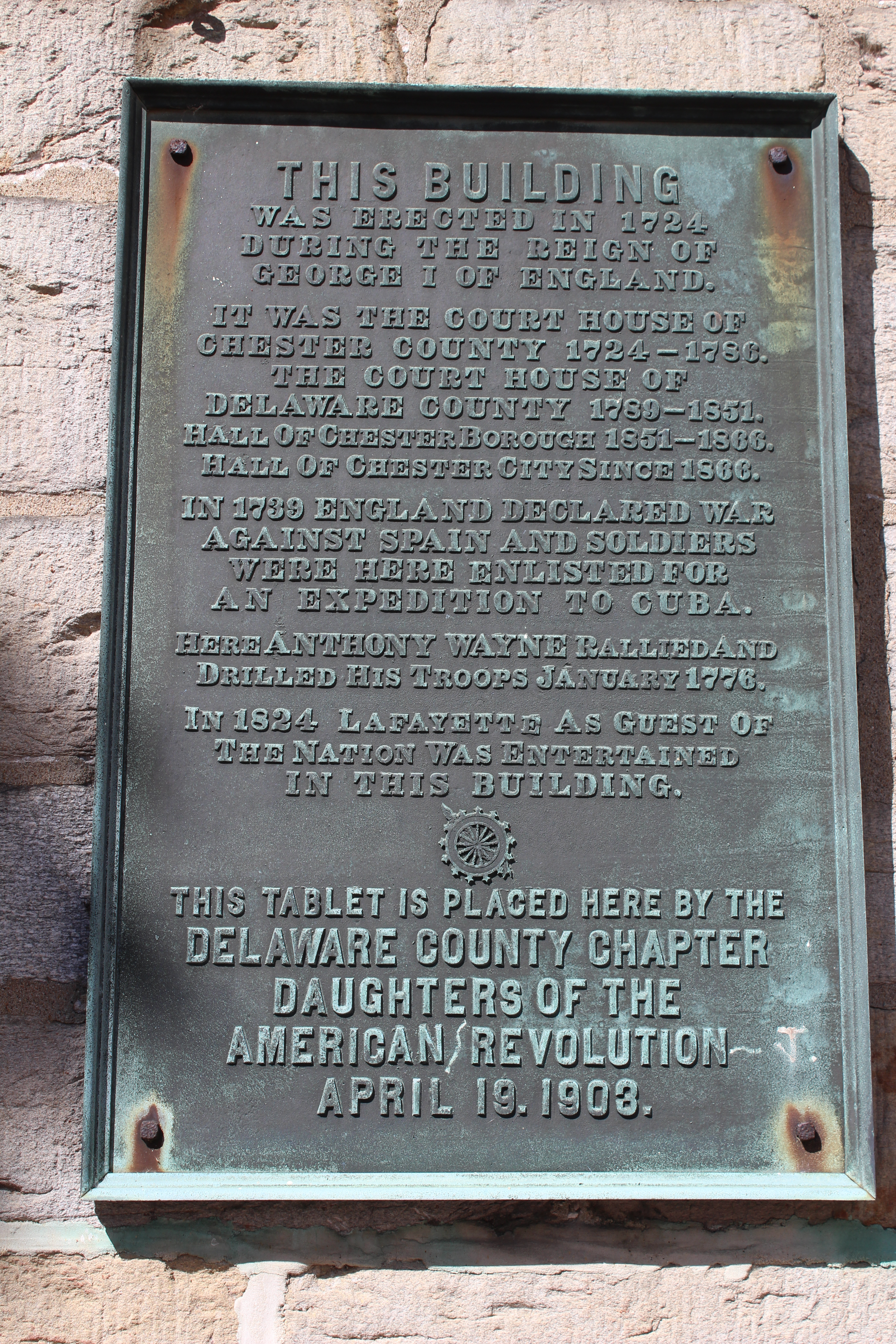
Plaque on the front of 1724 Chester Courthouse

The Chester courthouse was built in 1724 and was the fourth courthouse built in Chester. William Hewes, a Lower Chichester Township mason did the stone masonry work.

In 1789, the Chester County seat was moved to West Chester, Pennsylvania, and the Chester Courthouse served as the Delaware County courthouse. In 1850 the Delaware County seat was moved to Media, Pennsylvania, and the Chester Courthouse served as City Hall for the city of Chester.

The courthouse was used by the Delaware County Historical Society until 1966 when structural deficiencies forced them to relocate. Owned by the Pennsylvania Historical and Museum Commission, in July 2021 the Delaware County Council entered into a 99-year lease for the Courthouse at a cost of $1 per year. Unable to afford the maintenance of the building, the Commission sought to find a way to "offload" it. The Council in conjunction with the Delaware County Historical Commission will manage the building.

The court room was the oldest active court in use in the United States until 1967. Every year, one trial was held in the court room to maintain that status.

Each year in May, during the celebration of Law Day, a special ceremony is held at the Chester Courthouse. Students from the Chester-Upland School District present a mock trial before Judges of the Pennsylvania Court of Common Pleas and the Magisterial District Courts to commemorate the significance of the courthouse and its importance to American jurisprudence.

== See also ==
- List of the oldest courthouses in the United States
- List of state and county courthouses in Pennsylvania
