= Thomas Mundy Peterson =

First African-American to vote (1824–1904)

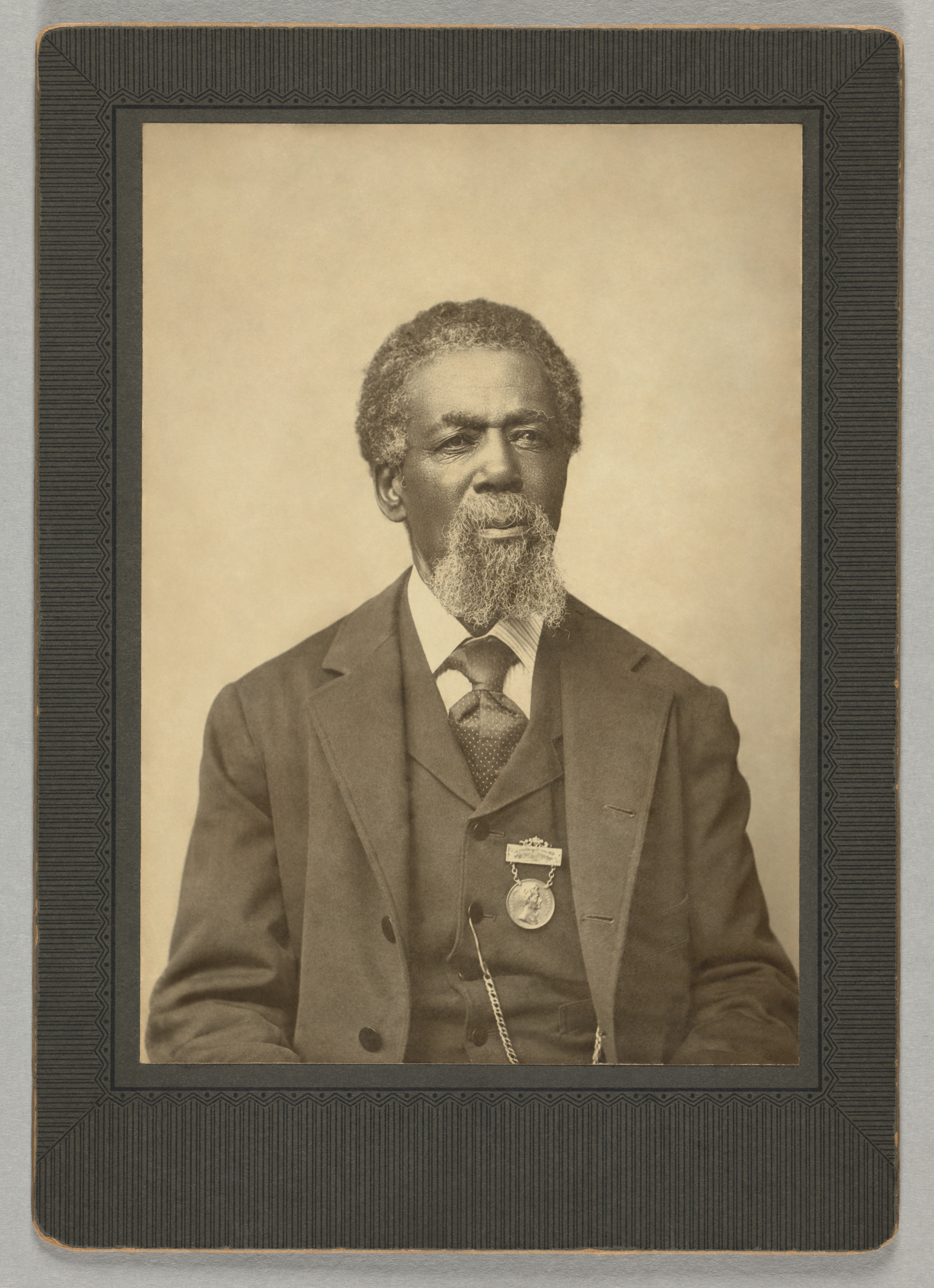
- Peterson in 1884
- Born: October 6, 1824; Metuchen, New Jersey
- Died: February 9, 1904 (aged 79); Perth Amboy, New Jersey
- Known for: The first African American to vote in the United States after the passage of the 15th Amendment

Thomas Mundy Peterson (October 6, 1824 – February 4, 1904) of Perth Amboy, New Jersey, has been claimed to be the first African American to vote in an election under the just-enacted provisions of the 15th Amendment to the United States Constitution.

His vote was cast on March 31, 1870; the Amendment had been ratified almost two months earlier, on February 3, but was only officially certified by Secretary of State Hamilton Fish on March 30.

== Biography ==
Peterson was born in Metuchen, New Jersey. His father, also named Thomas, worked for the Mundy family. His mother, Lucy Green, was a slave of Hugh Newell (1744–1816) of Freehold Township, New Jersey. She was manumitted at age 21 by Newell's will. After moving to Perth Amboy, Peterson married Daphne Reeves, whose mother, Bette, had been a slave on an estate of Andrew Bell in Perth Amboy.

For several years (between 1871 and 1878) Peterson was an employee of the Board of Education, serving as a custodian of School No. 1 located on State Street in Perth Amboy. He was also a general handyman around town and was active in both the United States Republican Party and the Prohibition Party. It has been claimed that he also holds the distinction of being the city's first "colored" person to serve on a jury; however, no direct evidence has been found. Peterson is most notably remembered for voting in the local election held at Perth Amboy City Hall over the town's charter. Some citizens wanted to revise the existing charter while others wished to abandon the charter altogether in favor of a township form of government. Peterson cast his ballot in favor of revising the existing charter. This side won 230 to 63. Peterson was afterward appointed to be a member of the committee of seven that made subsequent amendments leading to the final version that was approved by the State Legislature on April 5, 1871. Historical records as to his contribution to revisions in the form of minutes, writing, or other records are still wanting. Through his work on the committee, he helped shape the city's educational system by aiding in organization of the Perth Amboy Board of Education in 1870 and construction of School No. 1, the city's first public school. When the school opened for classes in 1871, 378 students enrolled and Peterson became its first custodian.

To honor Thomas Mundy Peterson as the first African-American voter after the passage of the 15th Amendment, the citizens of Perth Amboy raised $70 ($2500 in 2025 dollars) to award him with a gold medal. The full medal consists of a gold bar from which a two-inch diameter medallion was hung. The hanging medal featured a profile bust of a clean-shaven Abraham Lincoln. It was presented to Thomas Mundy Peterson on Memorial Day, which was then called Decoration Day, May 30, 1884. The celebrations included a mass meeting to honor Mr. Peterson, held at the City Hall. The committee in charge was composed of James Lawrence Kearny, Patrick Convery, both of whom had been city officials; J.M Boggs, former collector of the port; Alderman John Fothergill; Ex-Mayor Uriah Burdge Watson; and I.T. Golding, former city official. The committee was representative of the Democratic and Republican parties. There was a program of speaking in tribute to Mr. Peterson, presided by Mayor James M. Chapman. The Reverend Dr. David Stevenson, Pastor of the Presbyterian Church, delivered the invocation. The principal speaker was ex-Mayor William Paterson, Judge of the Court of Errors and Appeals. James Kearny, on behalf of the people of Perth Amboy, presented Mr. Peterson with his medal, which he is said to have loved and never considered himself properly dressed without it affixed to his left breast.

Charles F. Hartman (1888–1953) was a prominent Mississippi book dealer known for collecting and dealing in African-Americana and materials related to the history of the American South. As described by Heartman in 1945:

Little remains to be said. Peterson-Mundy sported a beard, and a portrait of him, wearing the medal, is known. In his old age, when he could not hold a full-time job, he was occasionally in want. Too proud to ask for anything, voluntary charitable administrations of his friends were apparently not sufficient, and it seems that on several occasions he had to pledge the medal for a small loan, to be redeemed at the earliest possible moment, until one day the greatest redeemer took hold of him, with the pledge unclaimed. It [the medal] passed into the hands of the Honorable Harold E. Pickersgill, Recorder of the City of Perth Amboy for many years, an indefatigable collector of New Jerseyana. It was one of his prized possessions. Some time after the judge's death I was fortunate to acquire the medal, an important memorabilia in the collection, where also can be found the pamphlet describing the history and transactions for the presentation, as well as a pencil-portrait sketch of Thomas Peterson-Mundy.

In 1948 Xavier University of Louisiana acquired a large portion of Heartman's Collection of Material Relating to the Negro Culture, the Peterson-Mundy medal included. It is presently preserved in the XULA Library Archives & Special Collections and has been utilized for exhibitions at numerous historical institutions including the National Museum of African American History and Culture. It will be on display at the Barack Obama Presidential Library and Museum as part of their inaugural exhibitions, running from June 2026 through 2028.

While he is known today as "Thomas Mundy Peterson", there are no contemporary records that include the three names together. The one exception is the cover for the program describing the ceremony when he was given the "voting medal", and that calls him "Thomas Peterson-Mundy". Contemporary documents refer to him as either Thomas Peterson or Thomas (or Tom) Mundy. His death certificate, the undertaker's accounts book, and a land deed all refer to him as "Thomas H. Peterson". In the obituary appearing in The Perth Amboy Evening News, he is called Thomas Henry Peterson.

== Legacy ==
In October 1989, the school where Peterson had worked was renamed after him. It is currently on State Street, Perth Amboy. Peterson has a plaque in Perth Amboy's City Hall. Peterson was an Episcopalian and a member of St. Peter's Episcopal Church (Perth Amboy, New Jersey).

In New Jersey, March 31 is annually celebrated as Thomas Mundy Peterson Day in recognition of his historic vote.

Peterson was widely credited as the first African American to vote after the ratification of the 15th Amendment—a result of his local election happening to be scheduled the day after the amendment's ratification. He was also often claimed as the first African American to vote in any US election. Several New England towns and Northern states had allowed some free men of color to vote since colonial days, though some later rescinded those rights. New Jersey had allowed black residents to vote if they met residency and property requirements until 1807. In the 1868 United States presidential election, more than 700,000 African Americans had cast votes in U.S. elections before Peterson.

== See also ==
- Timeline of African-American firsts
