= Old County Courthouse =

- U.S. National Register of Historic Places
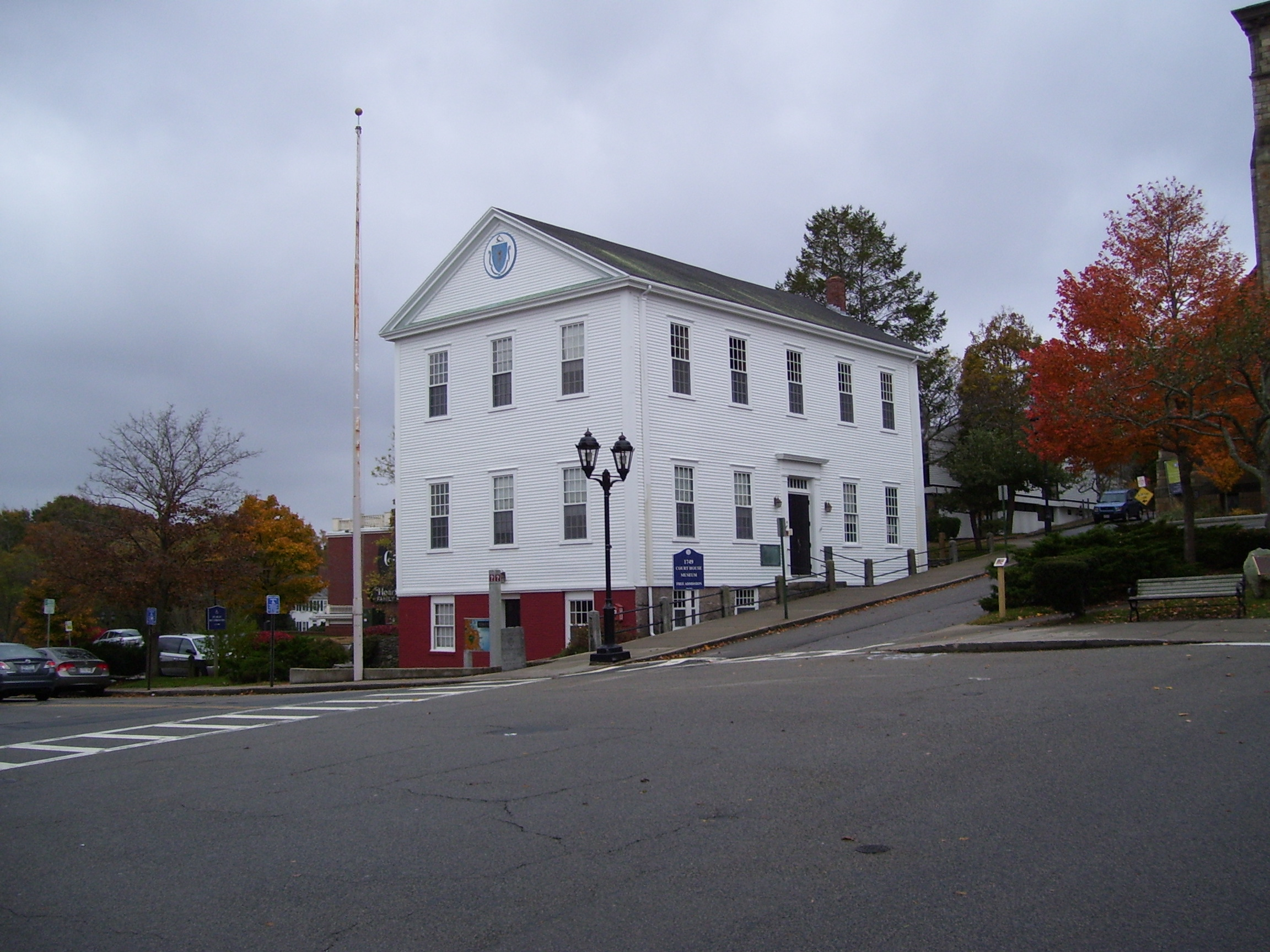

- Location within Massachusetts Location within the United States
- Location: Plymouth, Massachusetts
- Coordinates: 41°57′20″N 70°39′53″W
- Built: 1749; 277 years ago
- Architect: Peter Oliver
- NRHP reference No.: 72001297
- Added to NRHP: February 23, 1972

The Old County Courthouse (also known as the Plymouth Old County Courthouse or the Old Town House) is an historic court house on Leyden Street and Market Street in the Town Square of Plymouth, Massachusetts. Built in 1749, the two-story wood-frame building is believed to be the oldest wooden courthouse in the United States; it stands on the site of the first courthouse built by Plymouth Colony settlers, and may incorporate elements of a 1670 building. The site was originally the site of Edward Winslow's first house in Plymouth.

It is five bays wide and three deep, with a center entry flanked by sidelight windows and pilasters, and topped by a gabled pediment. It was built by Peter Oliver, and initially served as both a courthouse and as town offices. It was converted to solely municipal use in 1821, and had a myriad of municipal functions since then. In the 1970s it was converted into a museum.

The building was added to the National Register of Historic Places in 1972. It is now known as the 1749 Court House and Museum, and is open from June to September with exhibits of early Plymouth history.

== Gallery ==
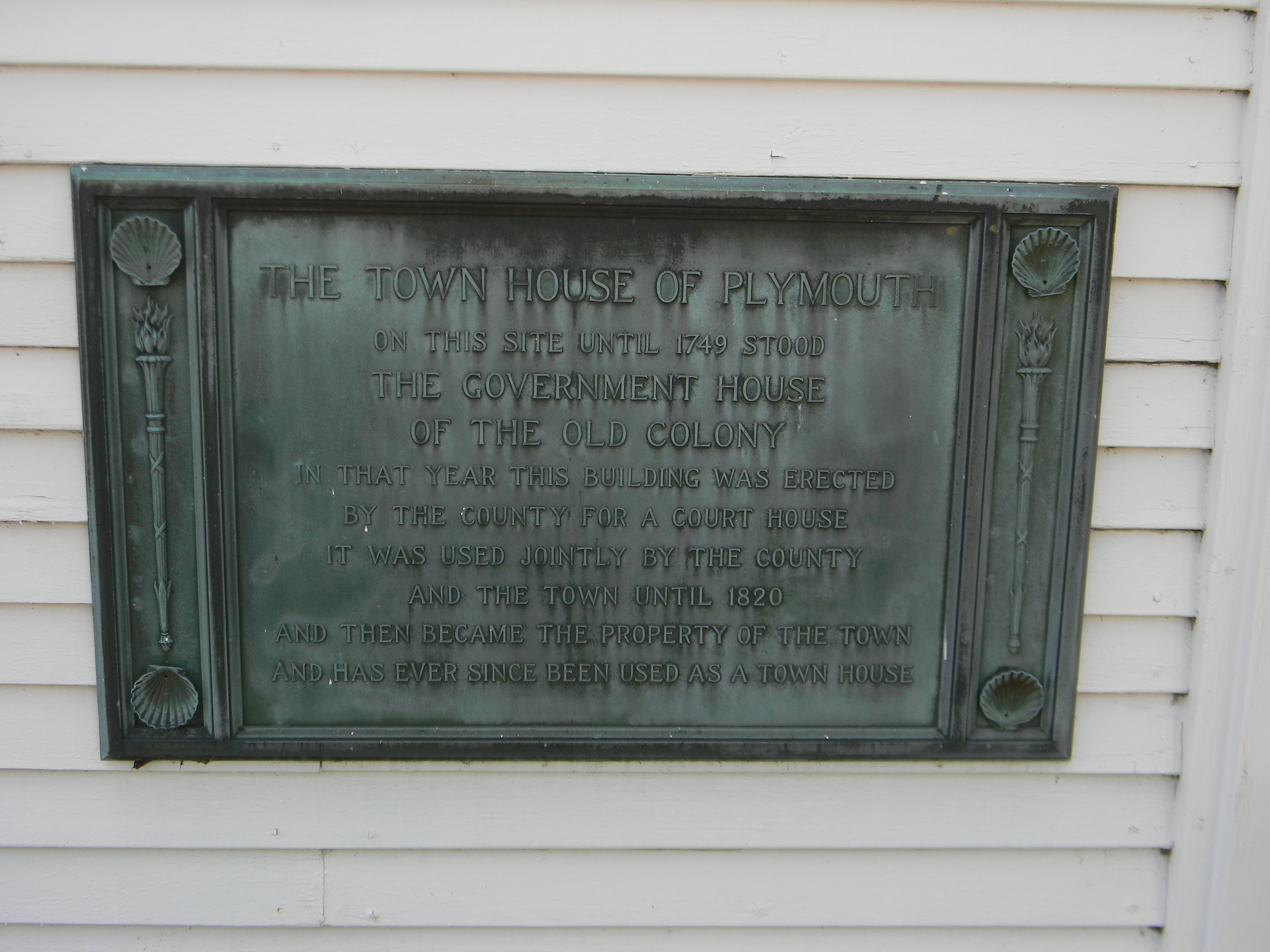
Descriptive plaque on exterior of courthouse, 2015

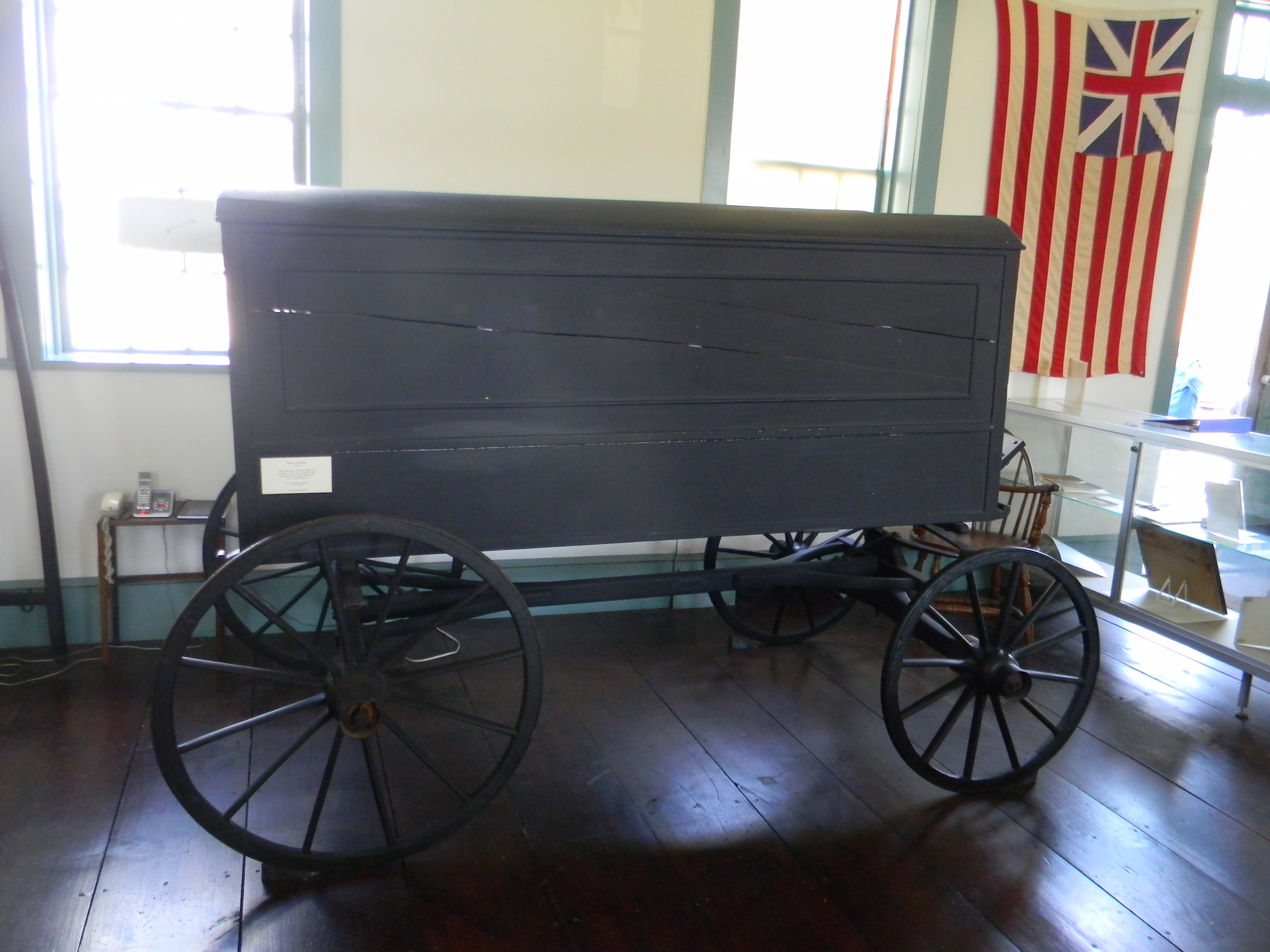
Herse on display in the old courthouse, 2015

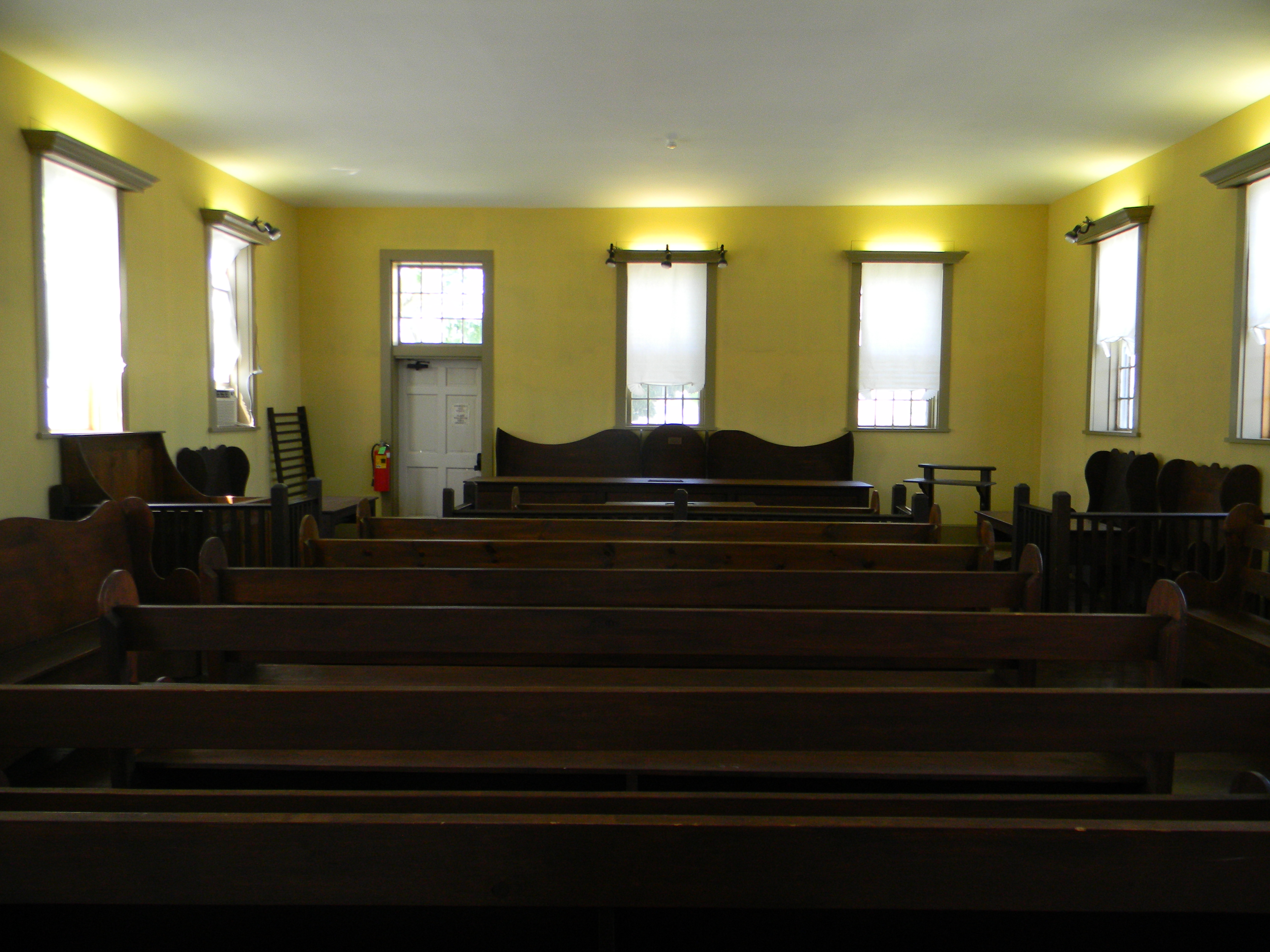
Courtroom on 2nd floor, 2015

== See also ==
- Oldest courthouses in the United States
- National Register of Historic Places listings in Plymouth County, Massachusetts
