= Queen Anne's County Courthouse =

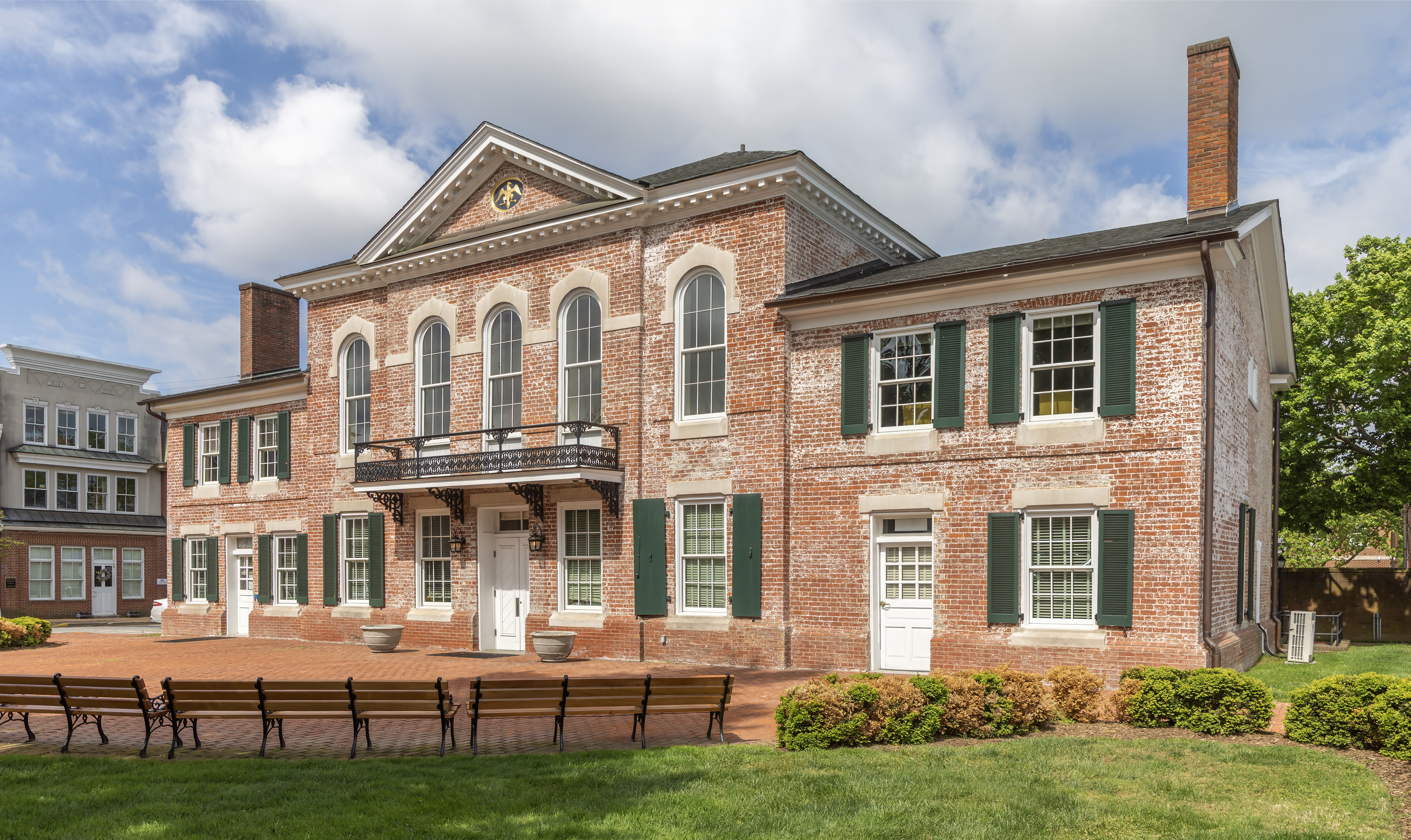
- Queen Anne's County Courthouse in 2026
- Interactive map of the Queen Anne's County Courthouse area

General information
- Architectural style: Federal
- Location: 100 Courthouse Square, Centreville, United States of America
- Coordinates: 39°2′43″N 76°3′56″W
- Construction started: 1791; 235 years ago
- Completed: 1796; 230 years ago
- Client: Queen Anne's County

The Queen Anne's County Courthouse is the oldest courthouse still in use in the state of Maryland. The building houses the judge for the Queen Anne's County Circuit Court, the judge's chambers, a courtroom, a jurors' assembly room, clerks offices and a small detention lock-up.

== History ==
The courthouse was authorized by acts of the Maryland General Assembly after the removal of the county seat from Queenstown to Chester Mills and then Centreville. It was erected between 1791 and 1796 on land purchased from Elizabeth Nicholson from her portion of the Chesterfield Estate, the estate of her grandfather, William Sweatman.
